= Aubrey Valley =

Valley in Arizona

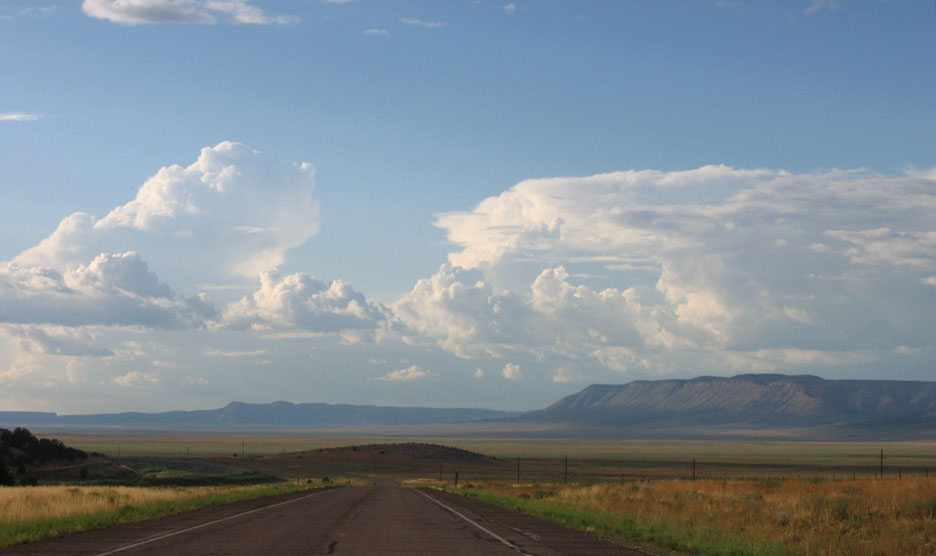
- south valley, view north, Aubrey Cliffs at east

- Location within Arizona
- Length: 35 mi (56 km)

Geography
- Country: United States
- State: Arizona
- Regions: Coconino Plateau; Aubrey Cliffs
- Counties: Coconino; Yavapai
- Communities: List: Grand Canyon Caverns; Yampai; Pica; Fraziers Well; Audley
- Borders on: List: Laguna Valley; Aubrey Cliffs; Juniper Mountains; Seventyfour Plains; Yampai Divide; Blue Mountain region
- Coordinates: 35°27′26″N 113°08′14″W
- Interactive map of Aubrey Valley

Aubrey Valley is a 35-mile (56 km) long valley located in southwest Coconino County, Arizona with the northwest border of Yavapai County. The valley is located at the southwest border of the Aubrey Cliffs; to the west and southwest, the Yampai Divide and the Seventyfour Plains form flatlands between four bordering mountain ranges at the northwest terminus of the Arizona transition zone.

The Aubrey Cliffs form the east and northeast valley border, and are part of the escarpment at the southwest perimeter of the Coconino Plateau, southwest Colorado Plateau. The Aubrey Cliffs re-appear northwest of the valley's north end, at the southeast of Prospect Valley. The Toroweap Fault is buried near the center of Aubrey Valley, west of the cliffs, and continues northwest into Prospect Valley, and to the Colorado River, west Grand Canyon. The Hurricane Fault-(of the Hurricane Cliffs) begins there, and both faults continue, the Hurricane going northwest, the Toroweap northeast, into southern Utah.

The south Aubrey Valley is the route of historic U.S. Route 66, now superseded by Interstate 40.

The Aubrey Valley supports a population of endangered black-footed ferrets, reintroduced in 1996 due to Valley's prairie dog colonies and favorable grassland habitat.

== Access ==
The south valley region, near its south perimeter is traversed by Arizona State Route 66, (former U.S. 66), from Seligman, Arizona at the valley's southeast, and at the south terminus of the Aubrey Cliffs; (Seligman is at Interstate 40). Route 66 traverses north-east across the south valley terminus region to Grand Canyon Caverns, then mostly west across the Yampai Divide to Peach Springs, Arizona at the beginning of hills, and mountains.

The central valley has two routes that spur northwards from Arizona 66, west of Grand Canyon Caverns. The routes traverse west, and east of the central wash that drains from the north. Both routes are unimproved roads, and connect to Reservation Route 20, (Hualapai Reservation). Paved road, Res Route 18 traverses the northwest at the hillside foothills of the valley and passes Blue Mountain, 6,038 feet (1,840 m), continues northeast through Robbers Roost, Arizona in a section of hills, then meets Res Route 18 at Fraziers Well, Arizona, the north terminus of Aubrey Valley; the valley narrows here between Aubrey Cliffs, east, and hills and mountains to the west. The Aubrey Cliffs reappear northwest, west-northwest of this point, in the southeast of Prospect Valley.
