= Hurricane Cliffs =

Landform in Arizona and Utah, United States

- Cliffs
- Coordinates: 37.045°N 113.368°W
- Location: Utah–Paragonah, Iron County; Arizona–northwest; United States

The Hurricane Cliffs of southwest Utah and northwest Arizona are a red, limestone geographic feature, sets of cliffs along the western, eroded edge of the Kaibab Limestone; the cliffs are about 135-mi (217 km) long, with the south end terminus just north of the Grand Canyon. The cliffs are associated with the Hurricane Fault.

== Description ==
The Hurricane Cliffs are part of the landforms on the southwest perimeter of the Colorado Plateau, specifically the High Plateaus section; the High Plateaus are transitional to the Great Basin northwest, the Mojave Desert west, and the Arizona transition zone, southwest and south of the Coconino Plateau.

From Arizona, the cliffs trend north into Utah, but north of Hurricane, at Anderson Junction and Pintura, the trendline turns north-northeast, and by Cedar City, Cedar Valley, Summit, and the Parowan Valley, the trend is northeast. At the northeast end of Parowan Valley, which is the Tushar Mountains, the Hurricane Cliffs end.

Interstate 15 follows the foothills of the Cliffs from its north terminus, southwest through Parowan Valley, the townsites of Paragonah-Parowan, and leaves the cliffs at Anderson Junction and Toquerville.

The Old Spanish National Historic Trail descends from the north Markagunt Plateau through the Hurricane Cliffs into Parowan Valley just north of Paragonah. Adjacent south at Summit, and Enoch in northeast Cedar Valley, the Black Mountains narrow at the pass between the Hurricane Cliffs, and a mountain ridgeline, to only 1-mi; the Old Spanish Trail traversed through the pass then crossed west through the center-north of Cedar Valley.

Zion National Park lies nine miles east of the Hurricane Cliffs at Toquerville; the park contains extensive layers of the Kaibab Limestone.

=== Arizona ===
In Arizona, the Hurricane Cliffs border the east of north-flowing Hurricane Wash, located in Black Rock Canyon. From there, the Cliffs trend south to Twin Butte, 6,055 feet (1,846 m), then to Mount Trumbull, 8,028 feet (2,447 m), (the Mount Trumbull Wilderness), adjacent to the Sawmill Mountains, and west flank, Uinkaret Mountains, where the Hurricane Cliffs terminate.

The region of the west Uinkaret Mountains, (west Toroweap Valley), is the site of the Toroweap Overlook, below Toroweap Point-(above southeast Toroweap Valley), on the ridgeline of Coconino Sandstone, and the Toroweap Formation rocks above. The Hurricane Cliffs end/begin here, and it is also the connection point of the Hurricane Fault to the Toroweap Fault which crosses from the Grand Canyon, South Rim, and continues north-(North Rim), northeasterly, striking into south Utah. The region of the two faults also give rise to intrusive lavas through rock fractures, and the region is the southeast section of the Uinkaret volcanic field. Lava Falls and Vulcan's Throne are two land forms at the intersection point region of the two faults, (at the Uinkaret Mountains–Colorado River), with Lava Falls, flowing into the Grand Canyon, and with Lava Falls Rapids being one of the largest rapids, blocking the flow of the Colorado.

The Aubrey Cliffs are expressed south of the Colorado River, on the South Rim, and extend due-southwards. They are the west perimeter of the Coconino Plateau, (the Colorado Plateau's southwest).

== List of cities ==
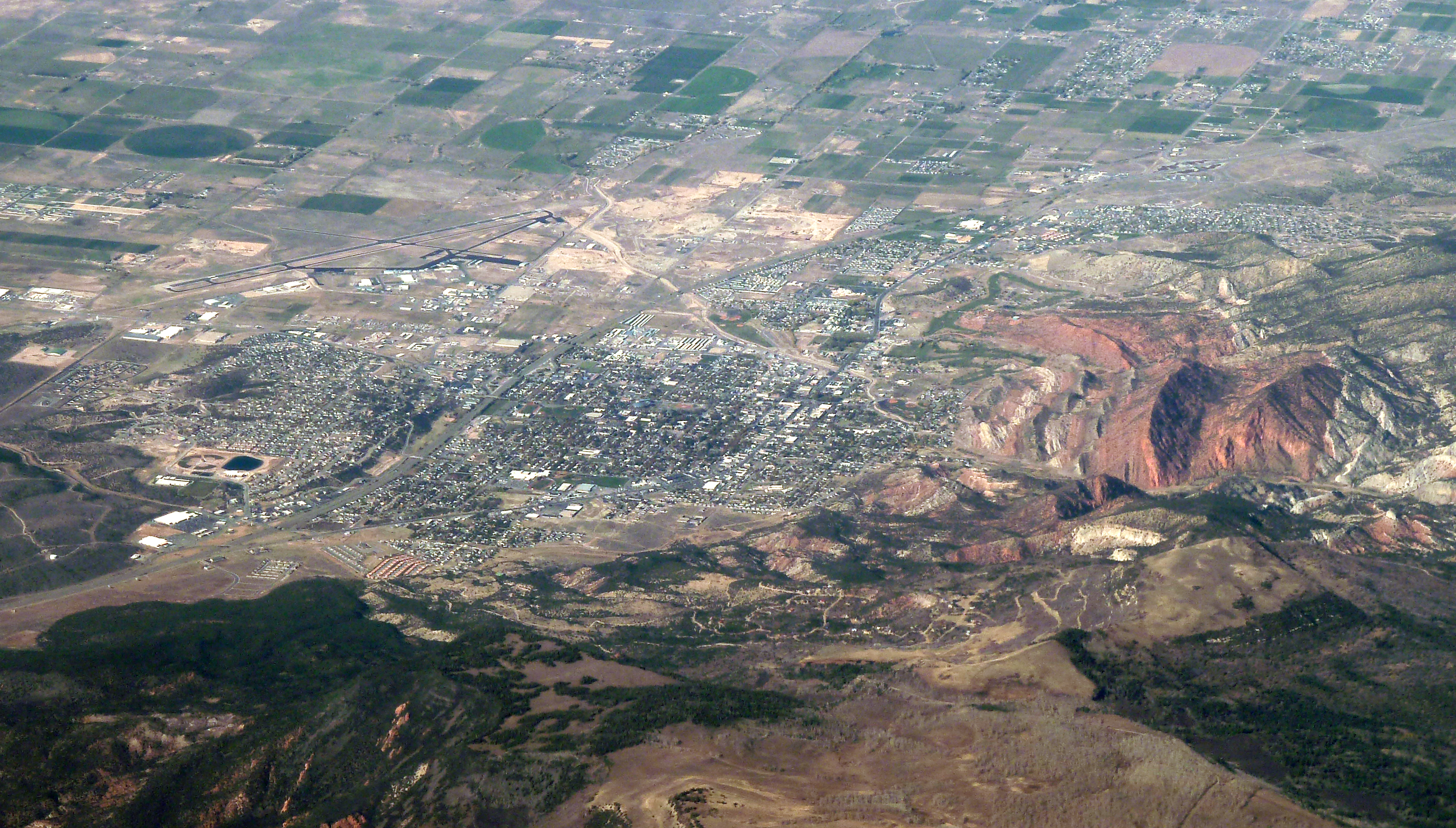
Cedar City, Cedar Valley, and the Hurricane Cliffs

The following is a list of cities, and their elevation, adjacent the foothills of the Hurricane Cliffs.

Cities, from north to south:

- Parowan Valley:
  - Paragonah, 5879 ft
  - Parowan, 6017 ft
  - Summit, 5955 ft
- Cedar Valley
  - Enoch, 5545 ft
  - Cedar City, 5846 ft
  - Hamilton Fort, 5568 ft
  - Kanarraville, 5541 ft
- Pintura
- Anderson Junction
- Toquerville, 3389 ft
- Hurricane, 3248 ft

== See also ==
- Geology of the Grand Canyon area
- Geology of the Zion and Kolob canyons area
