= Tuckup Trail =

Grand Canyon hiking trail

Coordinates: 36.24°N 113.06°W

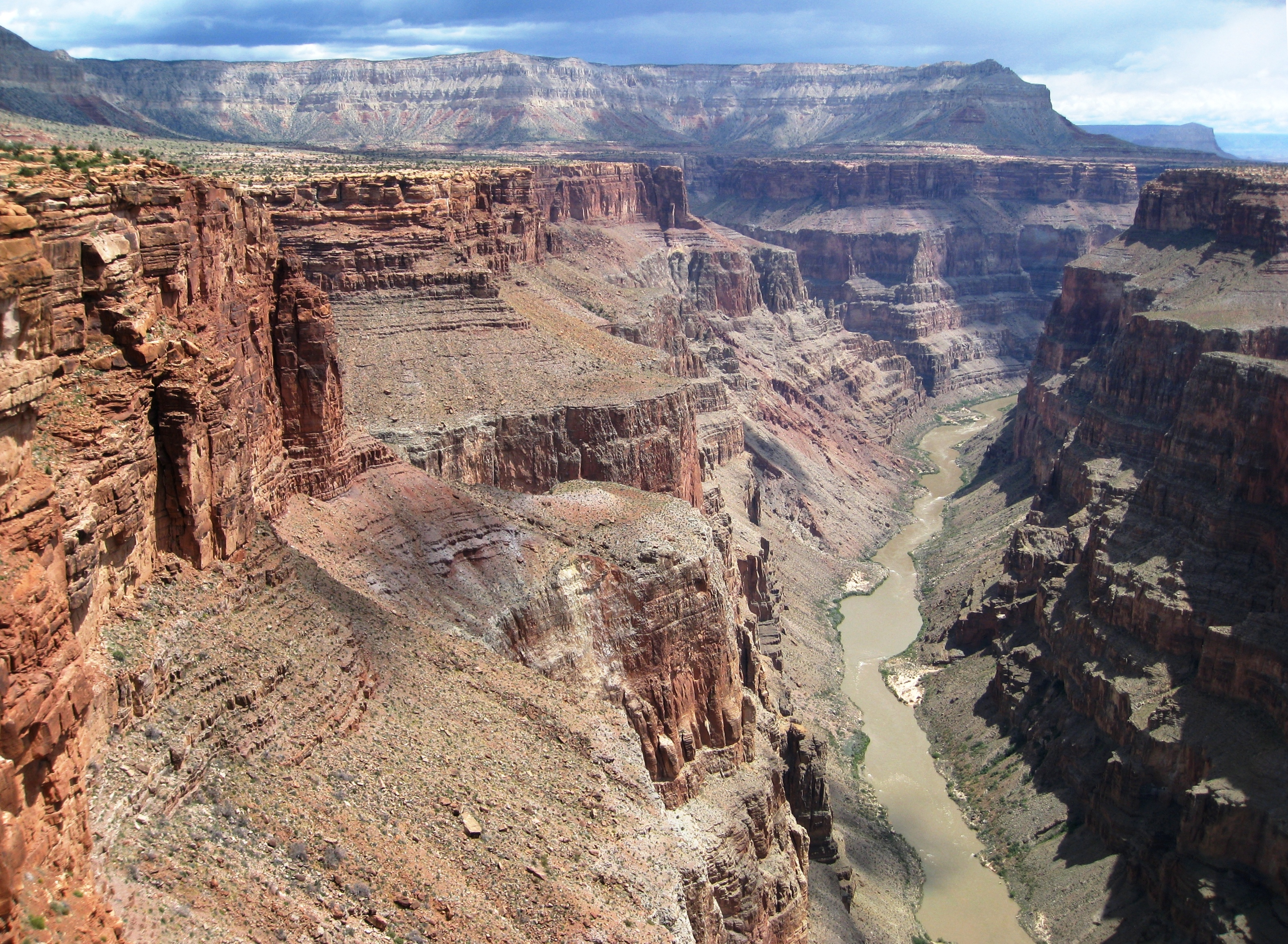
- 12-mi trail route, base of points, Toroweap Point, Big Point (Tuckup), & SB Point, 12 miles east; 'The Esplanade' across river on South Rim section
- Location: Grand Canyon National Park, Arizona, United States
- Use: Hiking
- Sights: Grand Canyon
- Hazards: Severe weather Overexertion; Dehydration; Flash flood

The Tuckup Trail is a 100-mile-long (160 km) hiking trail on the North Rim of the Grand Canyon, in Grand Canyon National Park, located in the U.S. state of Arizona.

It extends from Toroweap Point-(Toroweap Overlook), to 150 Mile Canyon on the Esplanade Sandstone member of the Supai formation. It originated as a cattle trail and many cowboy camps can be found along its extent. It has few reliable water sources, Schmutz Spring at the head of Tuckup Canyon being one of them.

== Toroweap Valley ==
The Toroweap Overlook occurs at a transition point of the west Grand Canyon. The Toroweap Fault has caused a down-faulted section to the west. Lava Falls, and Vulcan's Throne are two landforms produced by the Uinkaret volcanic field viewed to the west and northwest. One of the Colorado River's major rapids, Lava Falls Rapids, can be seen in the river (the blockage at the base of Lava Falls). The Tuckup trail traverses the bases of Toroweap Point, Big Point (Tuckup Point), and 12-miles east, SB Point.

== See also ==
- Geology of the Grand Canyon area
- List of trails in Grand Canyon National Park
- North Rim of the Grand Canyon
