= Toroweap Overlook =

Cliff in the Grand Canyon National Park

Coordinates: 36°14′51″N 113°03′21″W

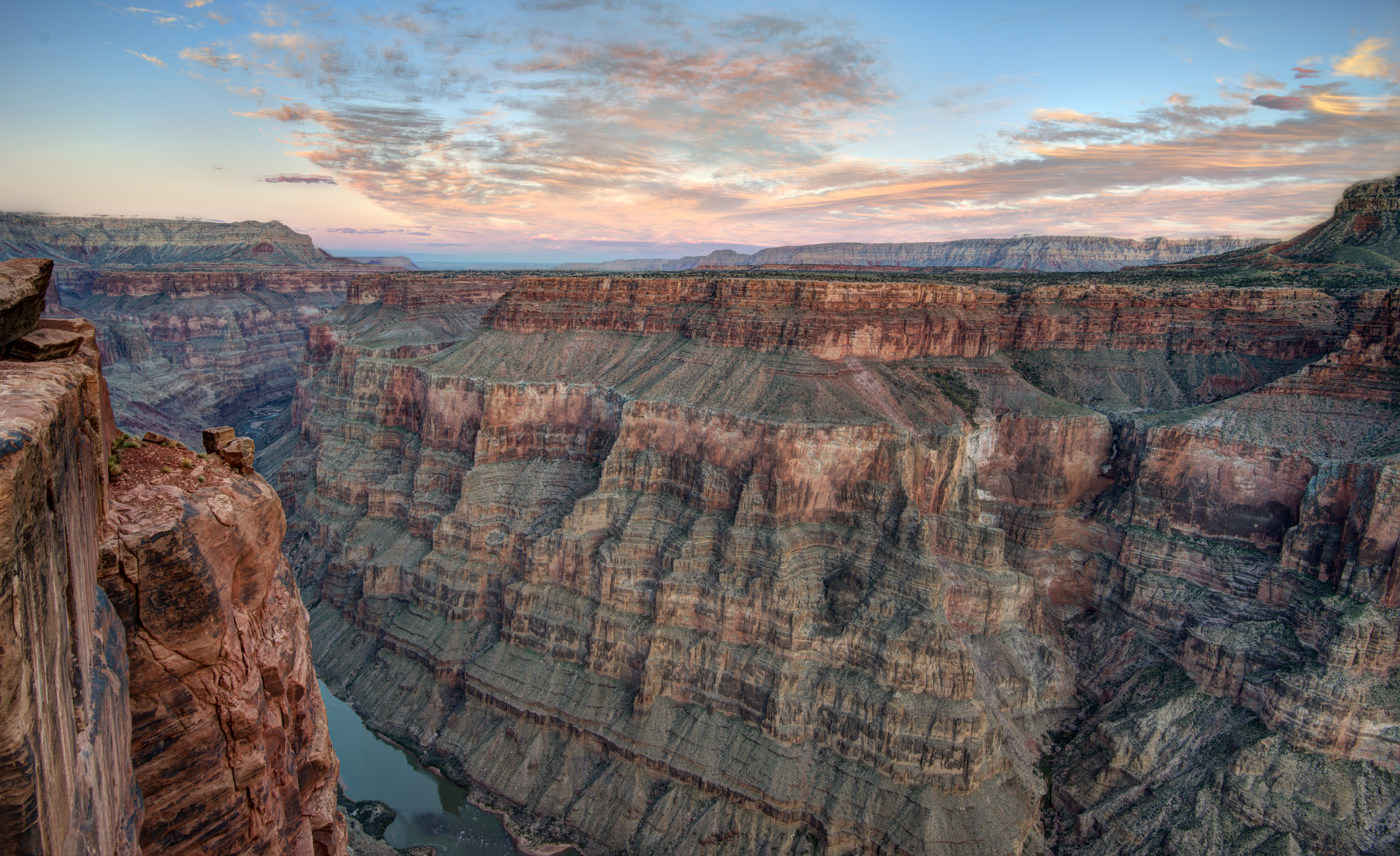
Sunset from Toroweap Overlook

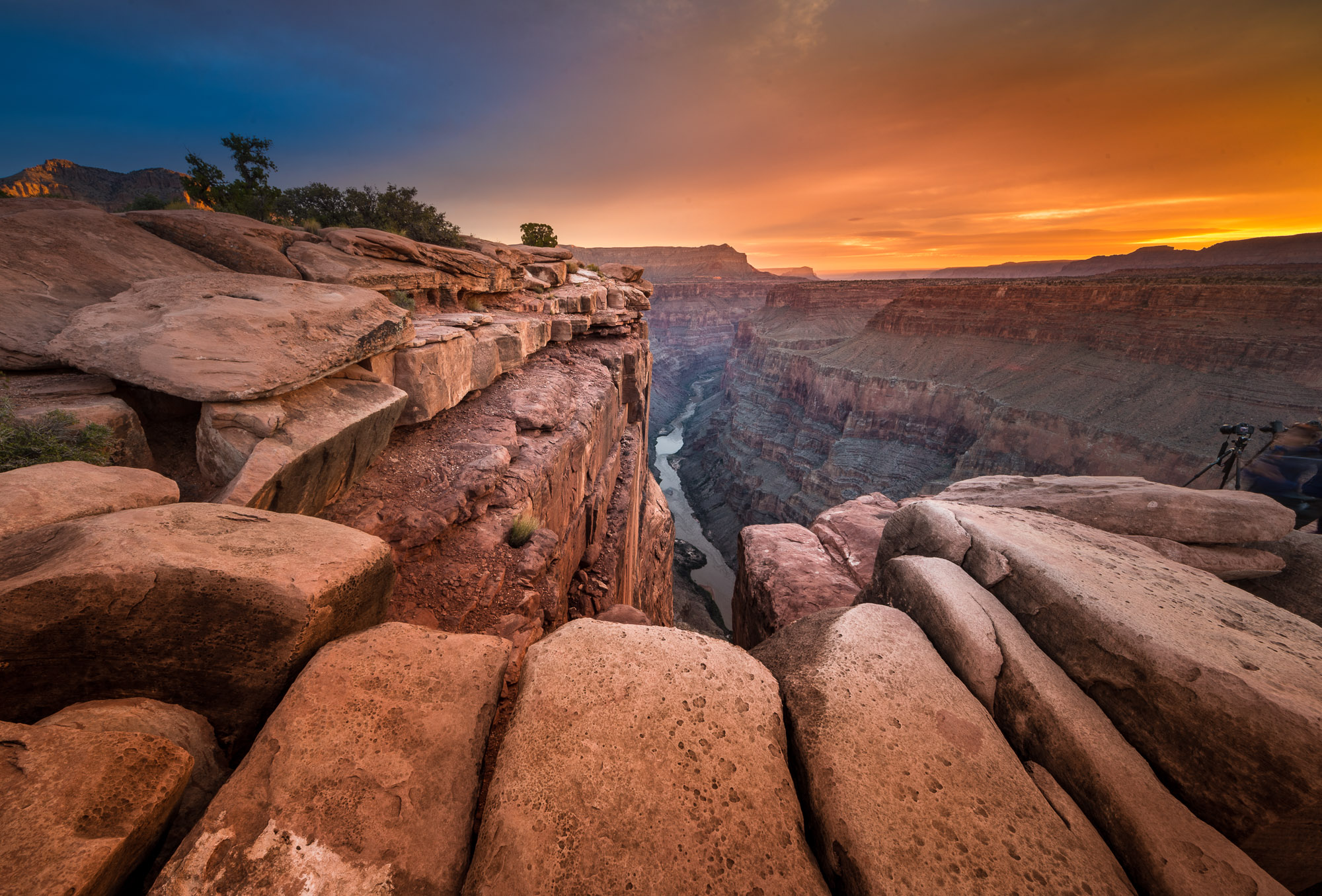

Toroweap Overlook (also known as Tuweep Overlook or Toroweap Point) is a viewpoint within the Grand Canyon National Park in Arizona, United States. It is located in a remote area on the North Rim of the Grand Canyon, 55 miles (89 km) west of the North Rim Headquarters (but 148 miles (238 km) by road). The overlook is the only viewpoint in the National Park from where the Colorado River can be seen vertically below. The overlook stands 3,000 feet (910 m) above the river.

== Terminology ==
Toroweap and Tuweep are used more or less interchangeably. The term Tuweep, a Paiute word for "the earth", was used for an early Mormon settlement in the valley, and is now used by the National Park Service to refer to the area. Toroweap, a Paiute term meaning "dry or barren valley", strictly refers to the valley and the overlook.

== Geology ==
At Toroweap the layer of soft Hermit Shale is about 800 feet thick, much thicker than farther east. Erosion of this layer formed the broad Esplanade Platform on the resistant Esplanade Sandstone. Further erosion formed a deep side canyon, draining into the Colorado. The Toroweap Fault underlies the valley, and volcanic activity along the fault resulted in the Uinkaret volcanic field, from where lava flows filled the side canyon. Sediment and lava flows eventually filled the side canyon to the level of the Esplanade Platform. The high outer rim of the Grand Canyon is absent at Toroweap, and the overlook can therefore be reached by a road which follows the Toroweap Valley to the brink of the Inner Gorge.

Just west of the overlook the Lava Falls can be seen spilling over the rim and falling to the river. Nearby is Vulcan's Throne, a cinder cone from the period of volcanic activity.

== Access ==
Toroweap is reached by rough unpaved roads. Mohave County road 109 leaves State Route 389 8 miles west of Fredonia, and runs 61 miles south to the overlook. The Clay Hole road reaches the overlook from Colorado City, 56 miles from Toroweap, however, this route should not be traveled after rain or snow. Toroweap can also be reached by the "Mt. Trumbull/Main Street Route" from St. George, Utah, 90 miles away on Bureau of Land Management road 1069 and Mohave County road 5.

== Facilities ==
There is no lodging, food, gas or water in the area. The National Park Service only intermittently staffs the Tuweep ranger station 6 miles north of the overlook. There is no cell phone service in this remote area. There is a primitive campground 1 mile north of the overlook that now requires reservations several days in advance from the Grand Canyon National Park backcountry office.

=== Hiking trails ===
The short Saddle Horse Loop Trail allows access to more viewpoints near the overlook. The Tuckup Trail starts near the Toroweap campground. The Lava Falls Trail provides a difficult route to the river from near Vulcans Throne. Another hike to the river is much shorter with only 1,000 feet of elevation change to the river compared to 3,000 feet at Toroweap. This trail starts in Grand Canyon-Parashant National Monument at Whitmore Canyon Overlook, 9 miles west of Toroweap. It is located in Whitmore Canyon at the overlook on the BLM1045 road. Take the Mt. Trumbull/Main Street Route west from Toroweap Valley past Mt. Trumbull. Turn south onto BLM1045 at the Mt. Trumbull Schoolhouse. This is a better option to reach the river.

== See also ==
- Geology of the Grand Canyon area
- List of trails in Grand Canyon National Park
- North Rim of the Grand Canyon
