= Hyaloclastite Dam =

Pleistocene lava dam in the Grand Canyon

Coordinates: 36.1436°N 113.1982°W

Hyaloclastite Dam was a 1,201-foot-high (366 m) lava dam that occupied the Grand Canyon of the U.S. state of Arizona. It formed during the Pleistocene epoch when basaltic lava flows from the Uinkaret volcanic field blocked the Colorado River. The dam failed catastrophically 160,000 years ago to produce the largest-known outburst flood on the Colorado River in the Grand Canyon. A slump block of basalt is the remaining remnant of the Hyaloclastite Dam.
