= Cope Butte =

Land formation in the Grand Canyon of Arizona

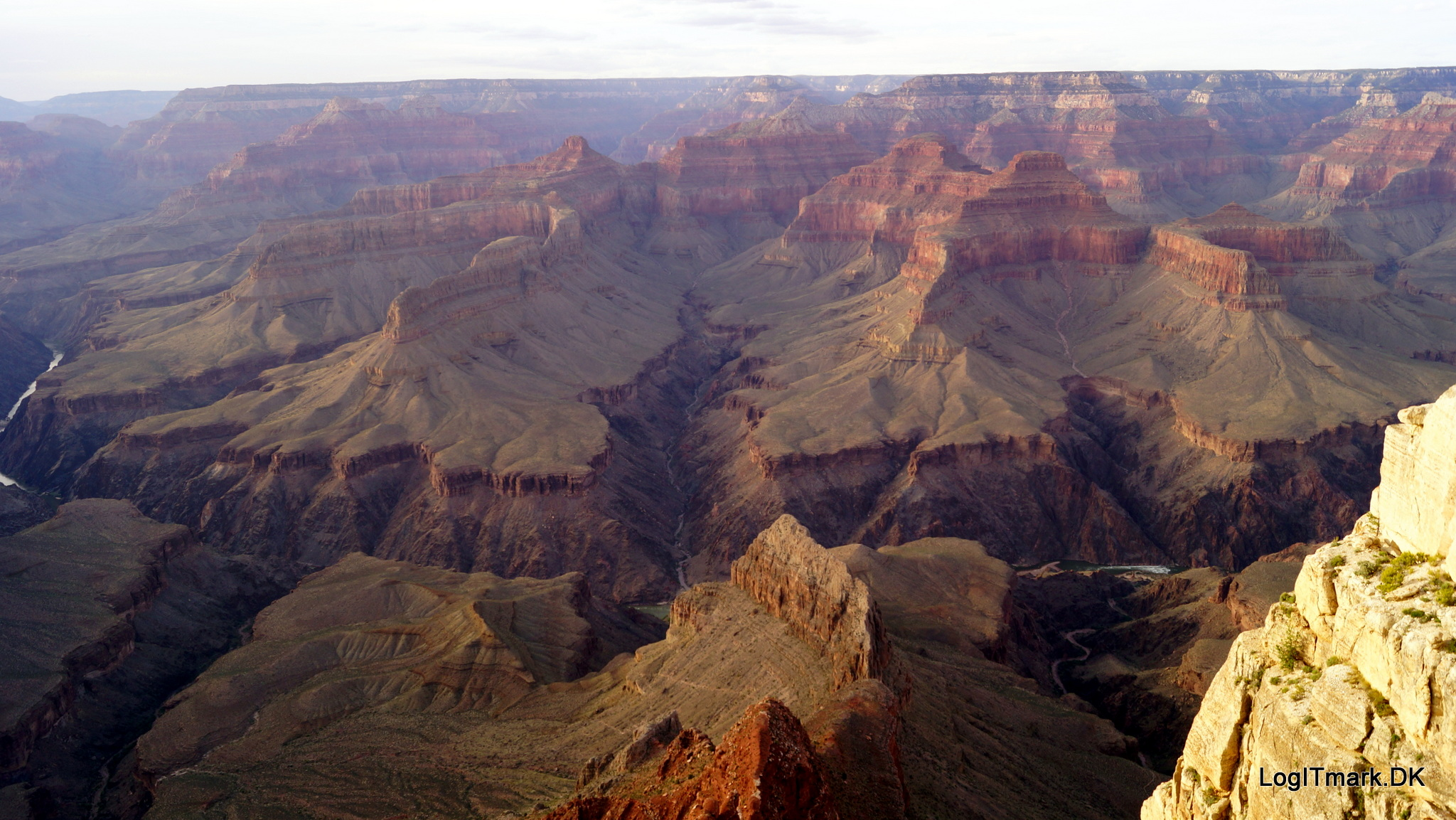
- (view due-north)-Cope Butte on Granite Gorge, opposite Ninetyfour Mile Creek & Canyon, and Tower of Set

Highest point
- Elevation: 4,528 ft (1,380 m)
- Prominence: 388 ft (118 m)
- Parent peak: Whites Butte
- Isolation: 2.02
- Coordinates: 36.0875°N 112.1074°W

Naming
- Etymology: Edward Drinker Cope

Geography
- Location within Arizona Location within the United States
- Location: Grand Canyon; Coconino County, Arizona. U.S.
- Topo map: USPS Grand Canyon

Geology
- Rock age: Mesoproterozoic down to Proterozoic
- Mountain type: sedimentary rock
- Rock type(s): Unknown?-prominence- (Temple Butte Formation?); Shinumo Quartzite; Hakatai Shale? Bass Formation-(Bass Limestone); Vishnu Basement Rocks-(at Granite Gorge)

Cope Butte is a 3,754-foot (1,144 m) prominence adjacent the course of the Colorado River, in the Grand Canyon and sitting on the south side of Granite Gorge. The butte is roughly 4.5 miles (7.2 km) northwest of Grand Canyon Village of the central Grand Canyon. The butte has a narrow, triangular footprint, and contains a northwest-by-south slightly arcuate ridgeline spire. The prominence is near the north terminus of the sharp ridgeline, and is composed of white Surprise Canyon Formation.

Cope Butte drains west into the Hermit Canyon watershed (Hermit Creek); the east side of the butte sits on the terminus canyon of Monument Creek (Grand Canyon). Because Cope Butte sits on Granite Gorge (Tonto Platform, south side) the Tonto Trail traverses northwest-to-southeast around the butte's base. The Hermit Trail, from the south, and from Hermits Rest viewpoint (South Rim), excursions down Cathedral Stairs (red Supai Group units), and courses down the southwest base of the butte, to enter Lower Hermit Canyon.

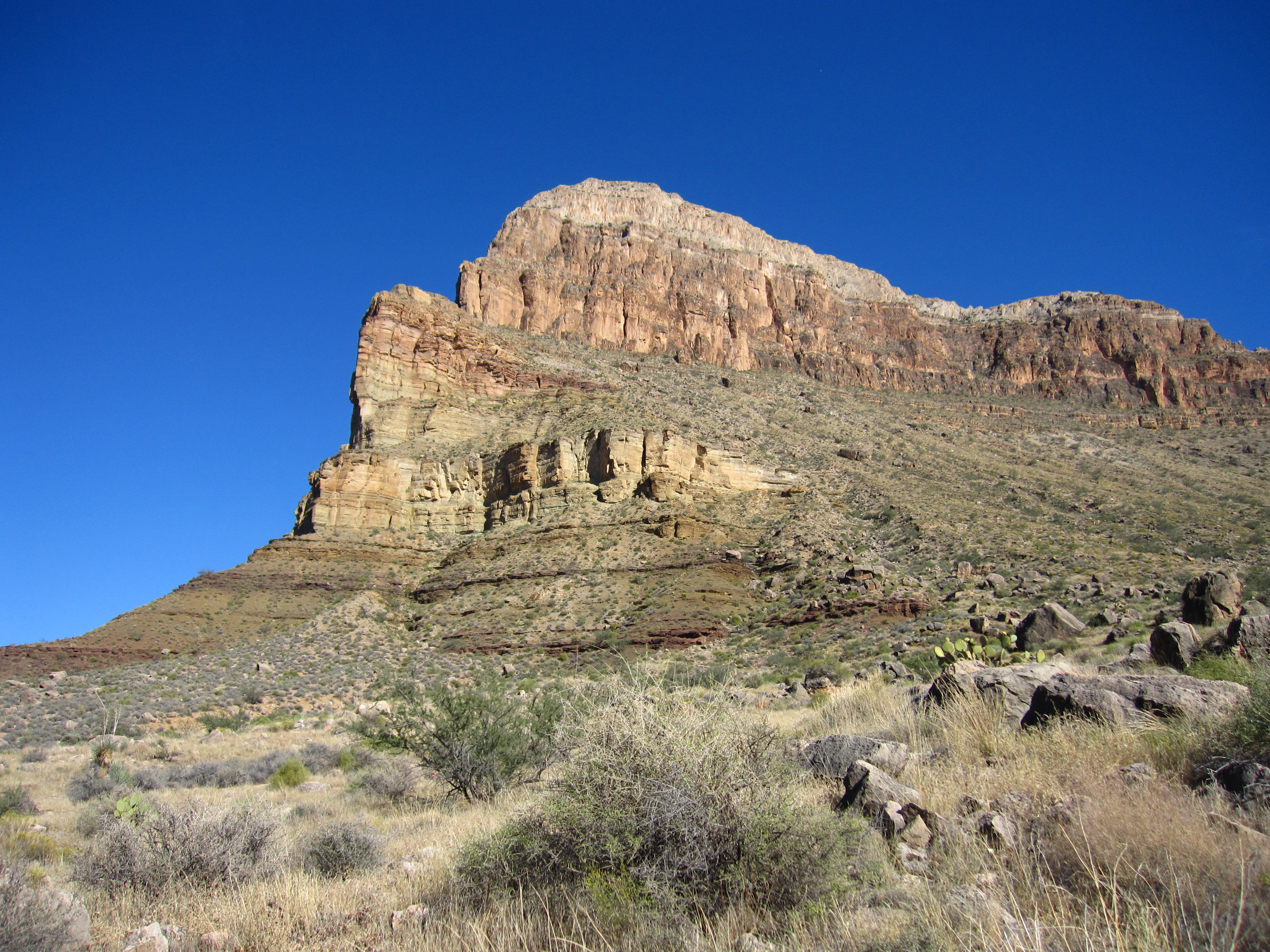
Cope Butte, west aspect from Tonto Trail. This feature honors American paleontologist Edward Drinker Cope

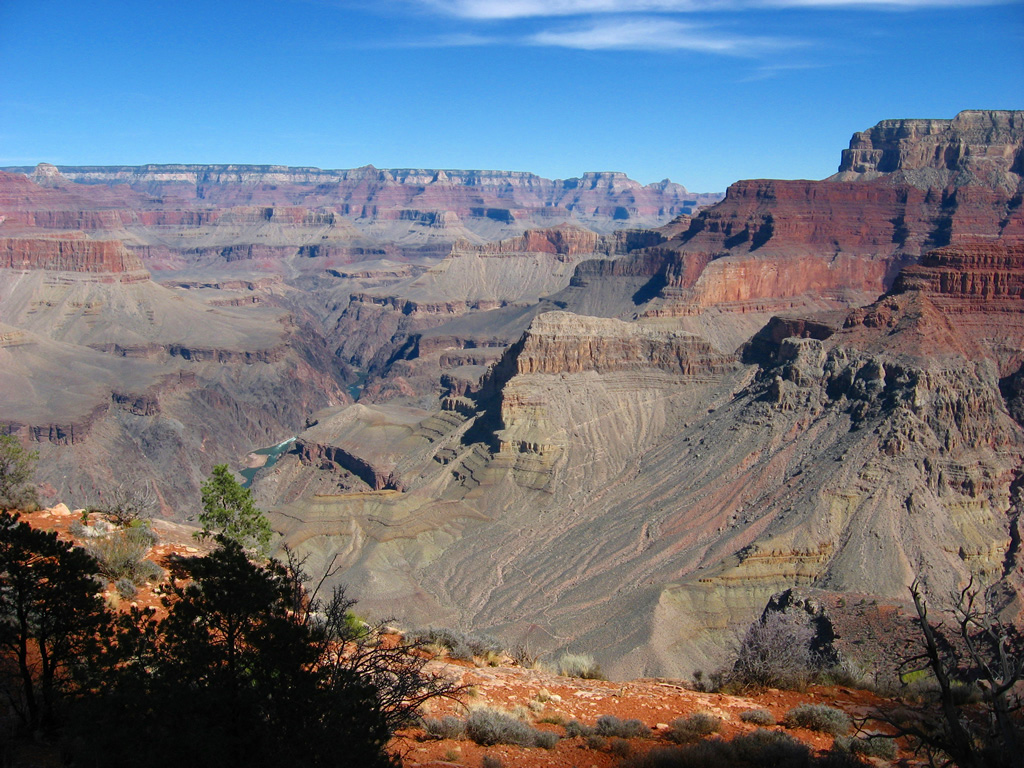
Cope Butte centered in bullseye, with The Alligator behind it. Looking east from Boucher Trail

== See also ==
- Geology of the Grand Canyon area
- Dana Butte
