= Whites Butte =

Landform in the Grand Canyon

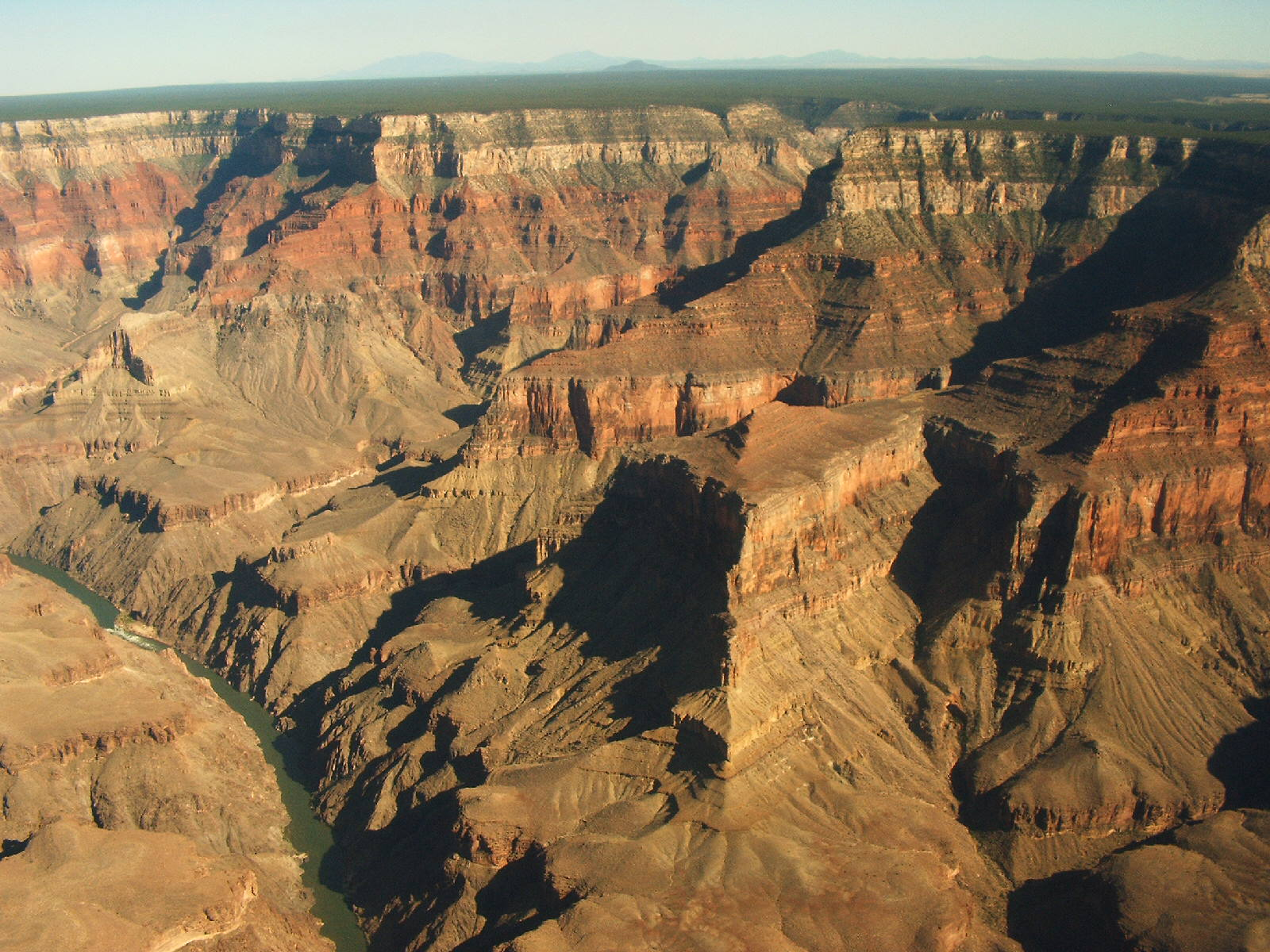
- northwest aspect (on Colorado River, West Granite Gorge); South Rim on horizon

Highest point
- Elevation: 4,860 ft (1,480 m)
- Prominence: 360 ft (110 m)
- Parent peak: Vesta Temple (South Rim)
- Coordinates: 36.0976°N 112.2313°W

Geography
- Location within Arizona Location within the United States
- Location: Grand Canyon; Coconino County, Arizona. U.S.
- Topo map: USPS Grand Canyon

Geology
- Rock age: Pennsylvanian down to Early Paleoproterozoic
- Mountain type: sedimentary rock: sandstone siltstone mudstone limestone shale sandstone
- Rock type(s): (Supai Group (4-units)); 2-Manakacha Formation-(cliff-remainder prominence, (unit no. 2 of 4); 1-Watahomigi Formation, Redwall Limestone-(massif) (Tonto Group (3 of 3)) _3-Muav Limestone _2-Bright Angel Shale _1-Tapeats Sandstone; Vishnu Basement Rocks

Whites Butte is a 4,860-foot (1,480 m) prominence adjacent the course of the Colorado River near the beginning of the Western Grand Canyon, (west terminus of the South Rim). The butte lies at the terminus of Travertine Canyon, the adjacent canyon west of Hermit Canyon. The Boucher Trail which begins at Upper Hermit Canyon, courses the east base of Whites Butte to reach the Tonto Trail-(west), on the Tonto Platform, south side of the Colorado River.

== Geology and biology ==
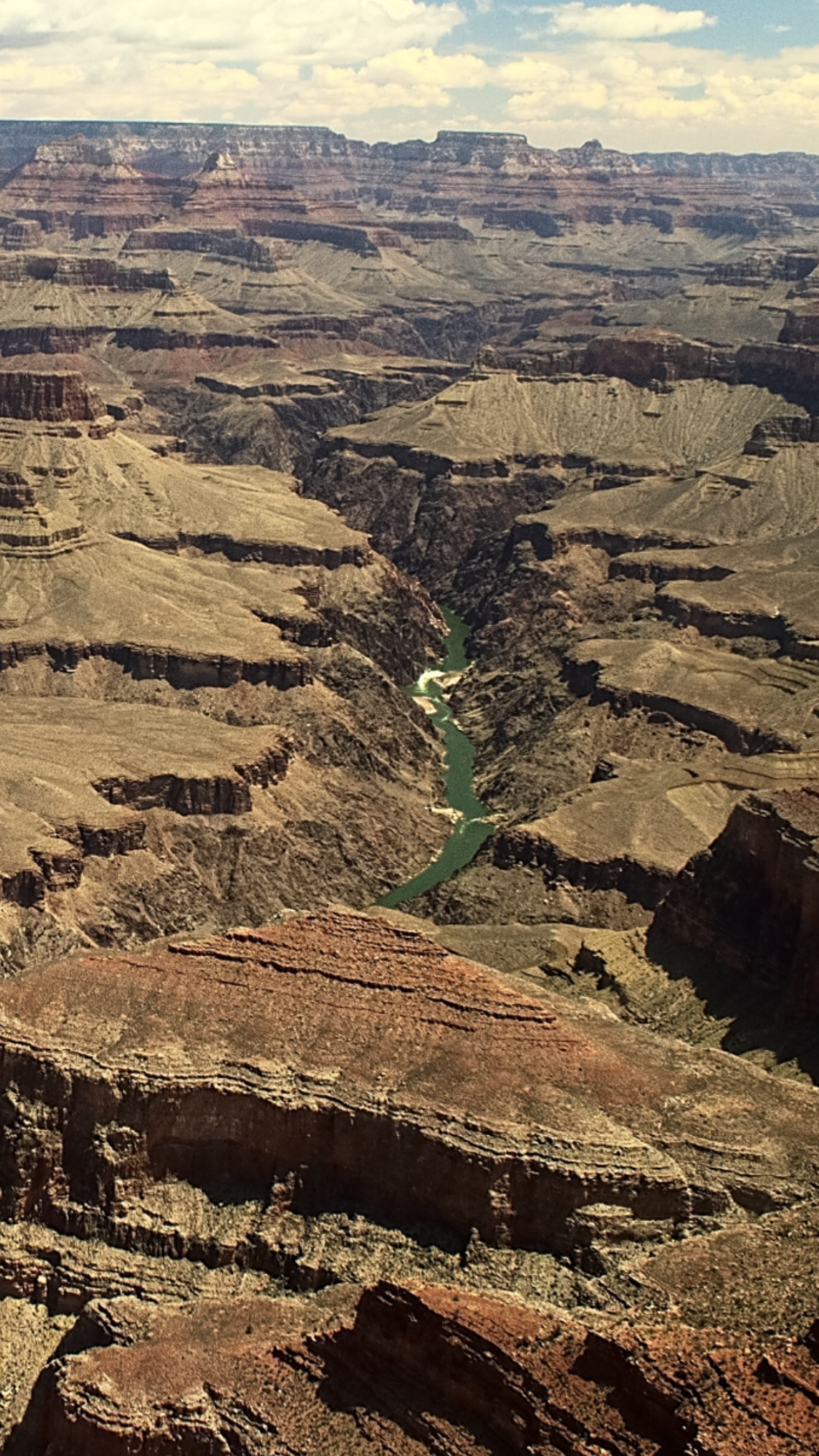
Whites Butte (west aspect), showing pyramidal-shaped prominence

The horizontal top of Whites Butte is a large platform of the cliff-forming Redwall Limestone, with vegetation growth. The east flank of the Redwall is slightly arcuate, and the prominence, upon the Redwall Limestone, is also arcuate, with a peak remainder of a pyramid-shaped, sloped Supai Group (4 of 4 geological units). The prominence is a minuscule cliff of Supai Group (unit 2), Manakacha Formation. Slope-forming slopes of Watahomigi Formation are below the high point of cliffs of Manachaka, which protect the slopes, and help form the pyramidal shape of the prominence.

== See also ==
- Cope Butte
- Supai Group, Manakacha Formation
