= Toroweap Fault =

Geologic feature in the Grand Canyon, Arizona

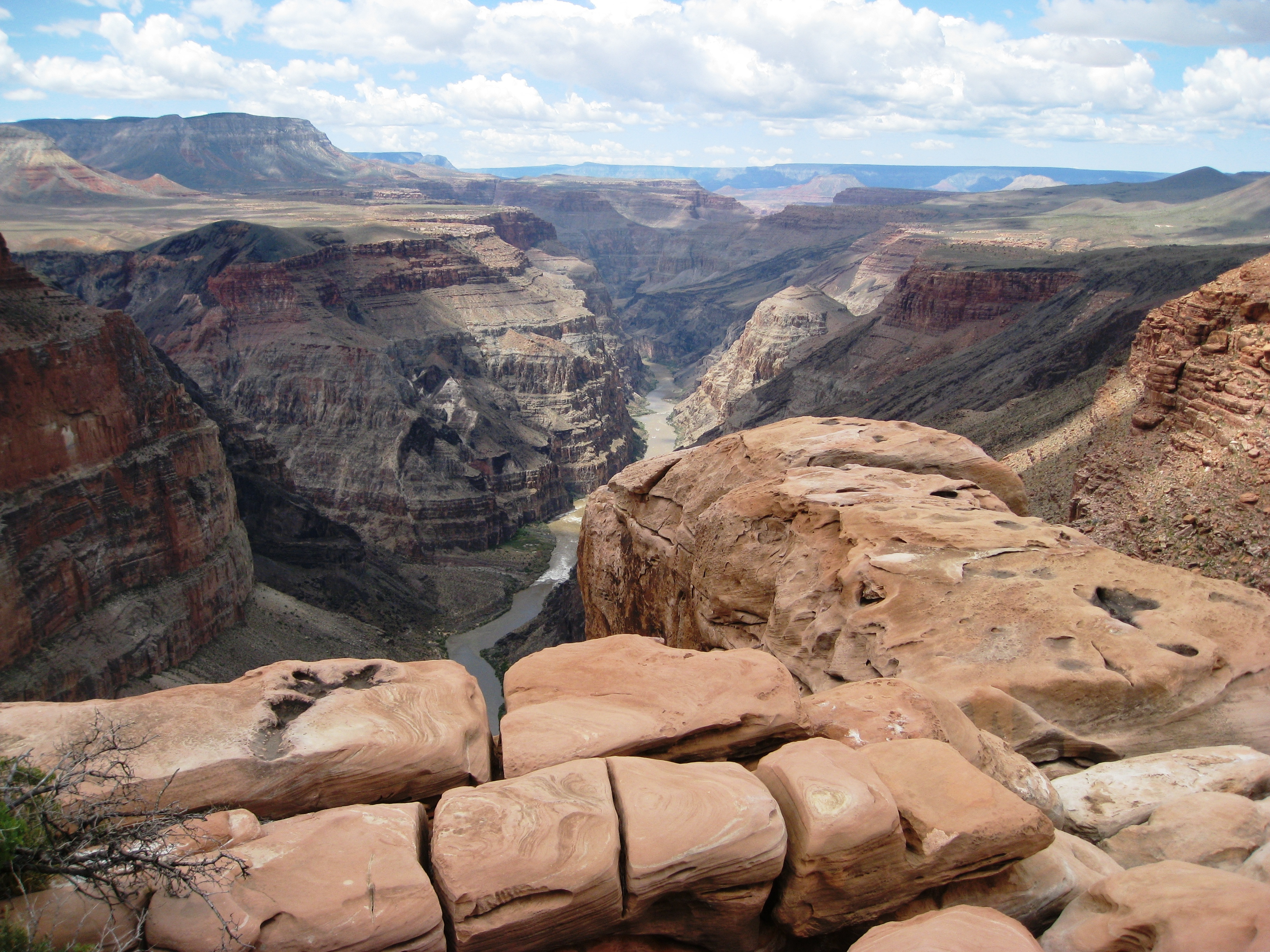
View southwest – view of fault from Toroweap Overlook, below Toroweap Point, west Grand Canyon, overlooking Colorado River. (with small (dk black)-volcano on South Rim, adjacent rim edge)

Strike of Toroweap Fault
(city or landform locations in red, other nearby locations in blue)
Foothills of Hurricane Cliffs, (city or landform locations)

The Toroweap Fault of northwest Arizona and southwest Utah is part of a fault system of the west Grand Canyon region, Arizona, US; also the west perimeter regions of the Coconino and Colorado Plateaus. The Hurricane Fault originates at the Toroweap Fault, in the region of the Colorado River, and strikes as the westerly depression of the Toroweap Fault. The Toroweap strikes northerly from the Colorado at the east of Toroweap Valley, and enters south Utah; from the Colorado River, the Hurricane Fault strikes north-northwest along the west flank of the small, regional Uinkaret Mountains, the west border of Toroweap Valley. The Hurricane Fault, and the Hurricane Cliffs strike into southwest Utah as part of the west, and southwest perimeter of the Colorado Plateau. The Hurricane Cliffs are made of Kaibab Limestone, an erosion resistant, cliff-forming rock unit.

The Uinkaret volcanic field is a resultant of the two-fault system, at the intersection region. Two example landforms, Vulcan's Throne, and Lava Falls both occur west of Toroweap Point, North Rim Grand Canyon, along the faults. A small volcano even occurs above the fault on the South Rim.

The 2-fault system is part of the west perimeter regions of the west, and southwest Colorado Plateau, called the High Plateaus Section.

== Grand Canyon, start of The Esplanade, & Aubrey Cliffs ==
In the Grand Canyon, the Toroweap-Hurricane Fault causes a change of surface rock expression in the canyon's west, on the South Rim. The Esplanade Sandstone an erosion resistant member of the Supai Group creates a platform called The Esplanade. The landform is upstream on the Colorado River, South Rim, across from Toroweap Point, and the Toroweap Fault and Aubrey Cliffs are The Esplanade's west perimeter.

The Aubrey Cliffs are the west edge of the Coconino Plateau. They extend from the Colorado River south to Prospect Valley, its east perimeter, jump through a mountainous stretch to the north of Aubrey Valley, the cliffs forming its east and southeast border, with the south terminus, Chino Point, just west of Seligman, Arizona, at Interstate 40. The south terminus of Aubrey Cliffs is also near the beginnings of Chino Valley (Arizona), part of the beginnings of the Verde River watershed. The Big Chino Wash of Chino Valley starts a south trend, but immediately turns southeast towards central Arizona.

The Aubrey Cliffs are composed of the Permian rocks on top, Kaibab Limestone, Toroweap Formation and Coconino Sandstone; also the Hermit Formation and Supai Group; at lower elevations (the Esplanade Sandstone member of The Esplanade, Grand Canyon). In the south at Aubrey Valley, the Coconino Sandstone is reduced to a thin member, compared to the up to 300 ft cliff maxima at Grand Canyon locales.

In Aubrey Valley at the southern region of the Aubrey Cliffs, the Cliffs are also eroded back along the Coconino Plateau; the Toroweap Fault is buried under gravels, towards the valley center, west of the north-trending cliffs.

== Toroweap Fault – Aubrey Valley, a corner of Colorado Plateau ==
Aubrey Valley is endorheic. The valley is attached to the Seventyfour Plains, southwest, a water divide between the Verde River watershed (Big Chino Wash), east, southeast, and west, tributaries to the Bill Williams River into the Colorado River. Four small surrounding mountain ranges border Seventyfour Plains–Aubrey Valley. The northwest mountains to Aubrey Valley (Blue Mountain) connect to the mountains surrounding Prospect Valley, with Prospect Valley's east border, the Aubrey Cliffs. Prospect Valley is very narrow; the south half is endorheic; the north drains directly into the Colorado River, just west of the Toroweap Overlook.

The next regions southeast that form the southwest border of the Colorado Plateau, are Sycamore Canyon-(Sycamore Canyon Wilderness), and adjacent east, Oak Creek Canyon. The diagonally expressed, northwest-by-southeast regional Arizona transition zone mountain ranges (about 30 across Arizona's 350 miles) are adjacent southwest to Sycamore and Oak Creek Canyons. The three mountain ranges that are at the northwest terminus of the transition zone, and the south perimeter region of the Sevetyfour Plains–Aubrey Valley, are the Aquarius Mountains-(with Aquarius Cliffs), Mohon Mountains, and (due-south of Seligman), the Juniper Mountains. The faults at the Aquarius Cliffs are "high angle normal faults", explaining the Aquarius Cliffs—Big Sandy River & Valley—Hualapai Mountains region as: "Colorado Plateau, east; Hualapai Mountains, classic Basin and Range; and south, 'Highly Extended Terranes', (also Basin and Range, southeast Mojave Desert meeting northwest Sonoran Desert).

== See also ==
- Geology of the Grand Canyon area
- Aubrey Cliffs, Aubrey Valley
- Hurricane Cliffs
