= Lava Falls Trail =

Grand Canyon hiking trail

Coordinates: 36.22°N 113.09°W

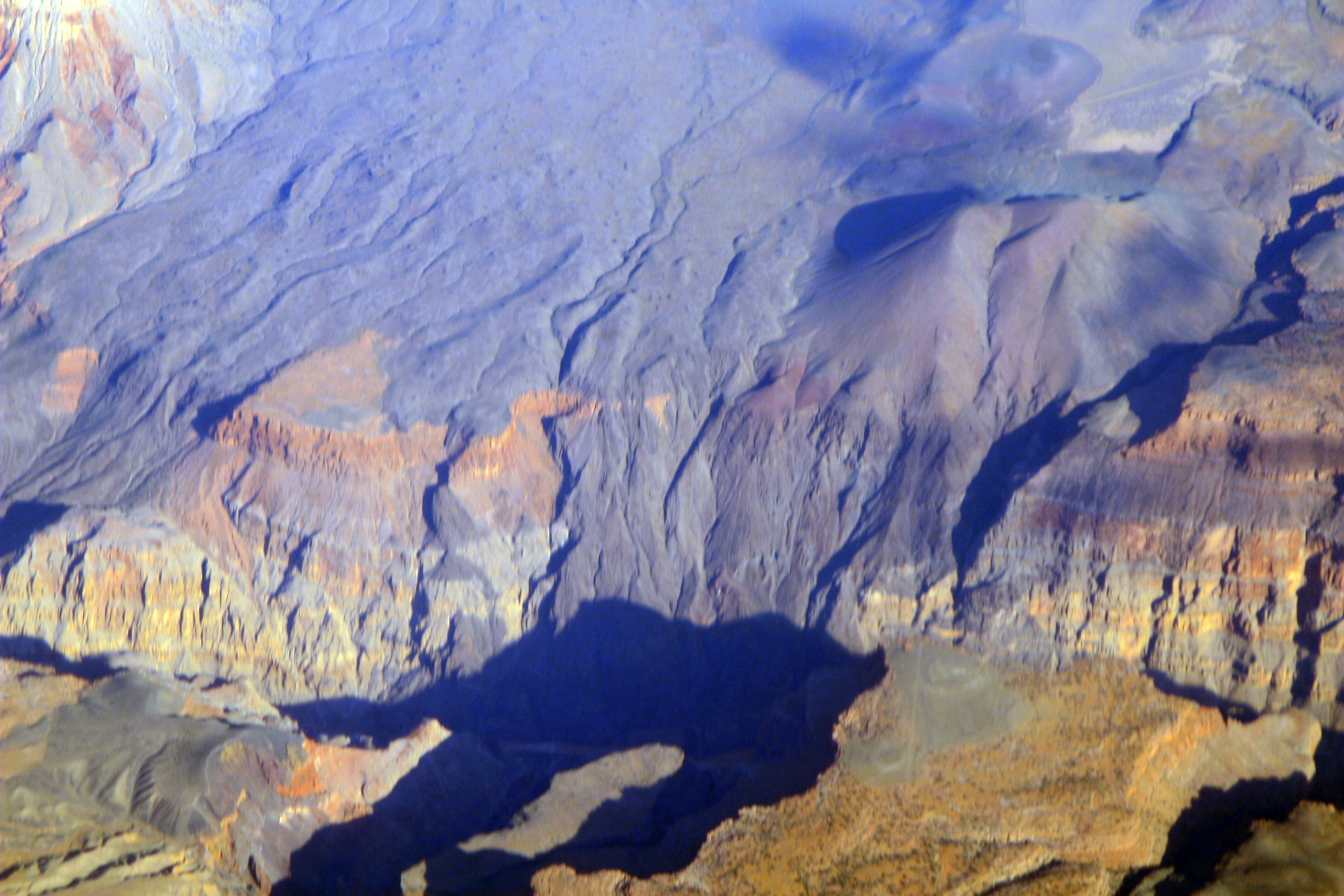
- Vulcan's Throne (top right) and Lava Falls, 2008 aerial photo. Trail is down the ravine to the left (west) of Vulcan's Throne.
- Length: 2 mi (3.2 km)
- Location: Grand Canyon National Park, Arizona, United States
- Trailheads: North Rim; Colorado River; Grand Canyon (North Rim)
- Use: Hiking; Backpacking
- Elevation change: 2,540 ft (770 m)
- Difficulty: Strenuous
- Season: Late September to early November
- Sights: Grand Canyon; Lava Falls; Lava Falls Rapids
- Hazards: Severe Weather; Overexertion; Dehydration; Flash Flood

The Lava Falls Trail is a hiking trail on the North Rim of the Grand Canyon National Park, located in the U.S. state of Arizona. It descends from the north rim of the Grand Canyon just west of the extinct volcano known as Vulcan's Throne to the Colorado River.

== See also ==
- Uinkaret volcanic field
- The Grand Canyon
- List of trails in Grand Canyon National Park
