= Grand Canyon Caverns =

Landform in Coconino County, Arizona

- Ŧathiil Ñwaʼa
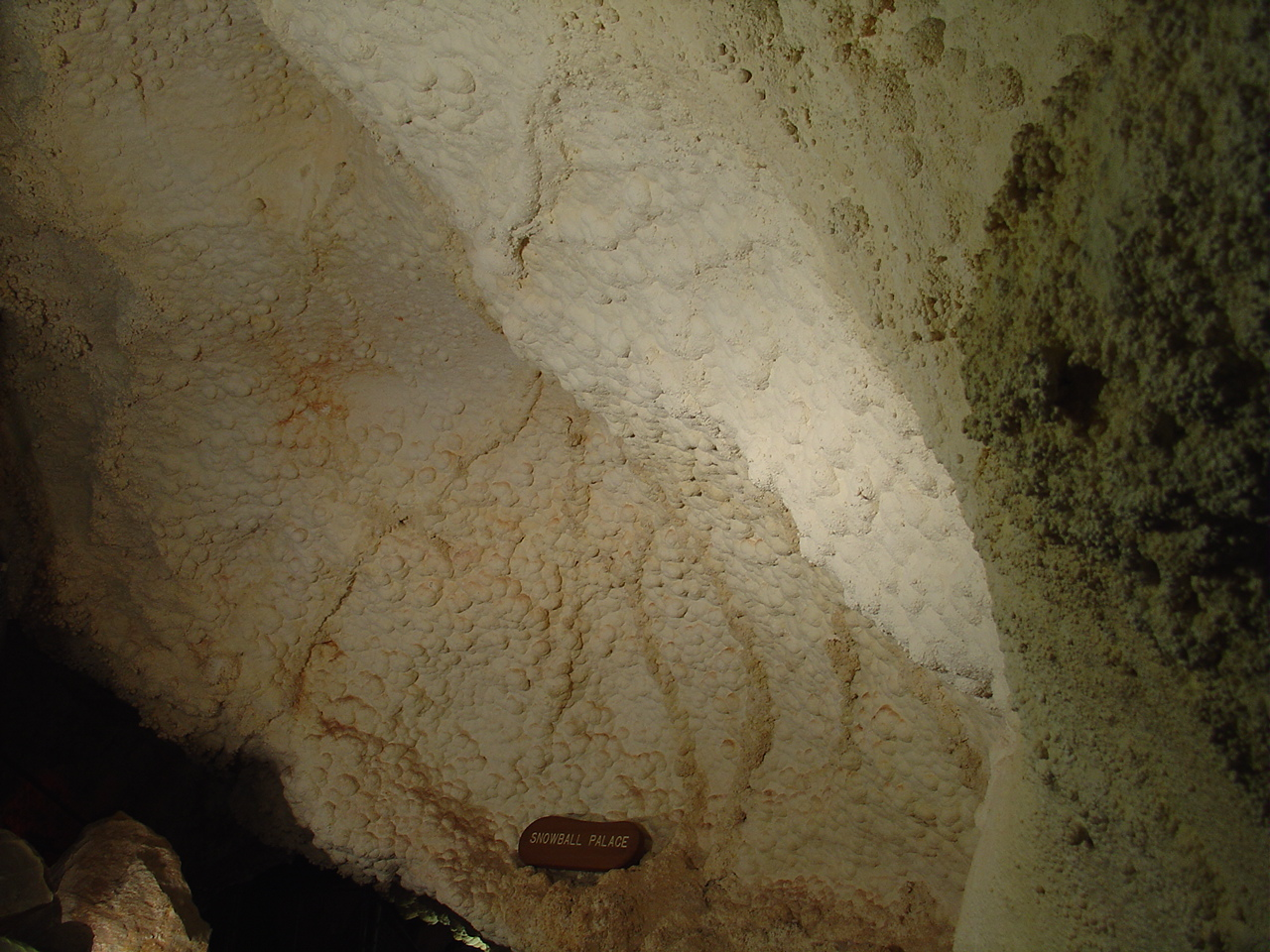
- Cave popcorn at the Snowball Palace in Grand Canyon Caverns
- Interactive map of Grand Canyon Caverns
- Location: Peach Springs, Arizona, United States
- Depth: 210ft
- Length: 2406ft
- Elevation: 5500ft
- Discovery: 1927
- Geology: Limestone
- Difficulty: low-Medium
- Website: gccaverns.com

The Grand Canyon Caverns (Havasupai: Ŧathiil Ñwaʼa or Ŧathiil Ñhaʼa, 35°31′44″N 113°13′54″W) are located a few miles east of Peach Springs, Arizona and lie 210 feet (64 m) below ground level. They are among the largest dry caverns in the United States. Because of the lack of water, stalagmites and stalactites are rare in the caverns.

== History ==
Walter Peck discovered the caverns by chance in 1927. He opened the caverns to travelers after first searching for gold, and he charged 25 cents admission which included a view of a purported caveman. In the 1960s, the "caveman" was shown to be the remains of two inhabitants of the area who had died in the winter of 1917–1918. They were part of a group of Hualapai Indians who had been harvesting and cutting firewood on the cavern's hilltop, and they were trapped there for three days by a snowstorm and the two brothers died from influenza. The ground was frozen solid and covered in snow, so they were buried in what was thought to be only a 50-foot (15 m) hole, as returning them to their tribal headquarters in Peach Springs risked spreading the flu.

In 1935, the Civilian Conservation Corps and the Works Progress Administration made an agreement with Peck to build a new entrance to the Caverns. In 1962, another entrance was built by blasting a 210-foot (64 m) shaft into the limestone and installing a large elevator. At that time, the natural entrance was also sealed off at the request of the Hualapai Indians as it was considered a sacred burial place.

Peck had named the caverns Yampai Caverns, with the name being changed several times. They were known as The Coconino Caverns until 1957. From 1957 through 1962, they were known as The Dinosaur Caverns. In 1962, they were renamed The Grand Canyon Caverns.

During the 1962 Cuban Missile Crisis, the U.S. government designated the caverns as a fallout shelter, with supplies for 2,000 people. These supplies remain in the caverns. In 1979, a cosmic ray telescope was installed at Grand Canyon Caverns, 126 feet (38 m) below the surface.

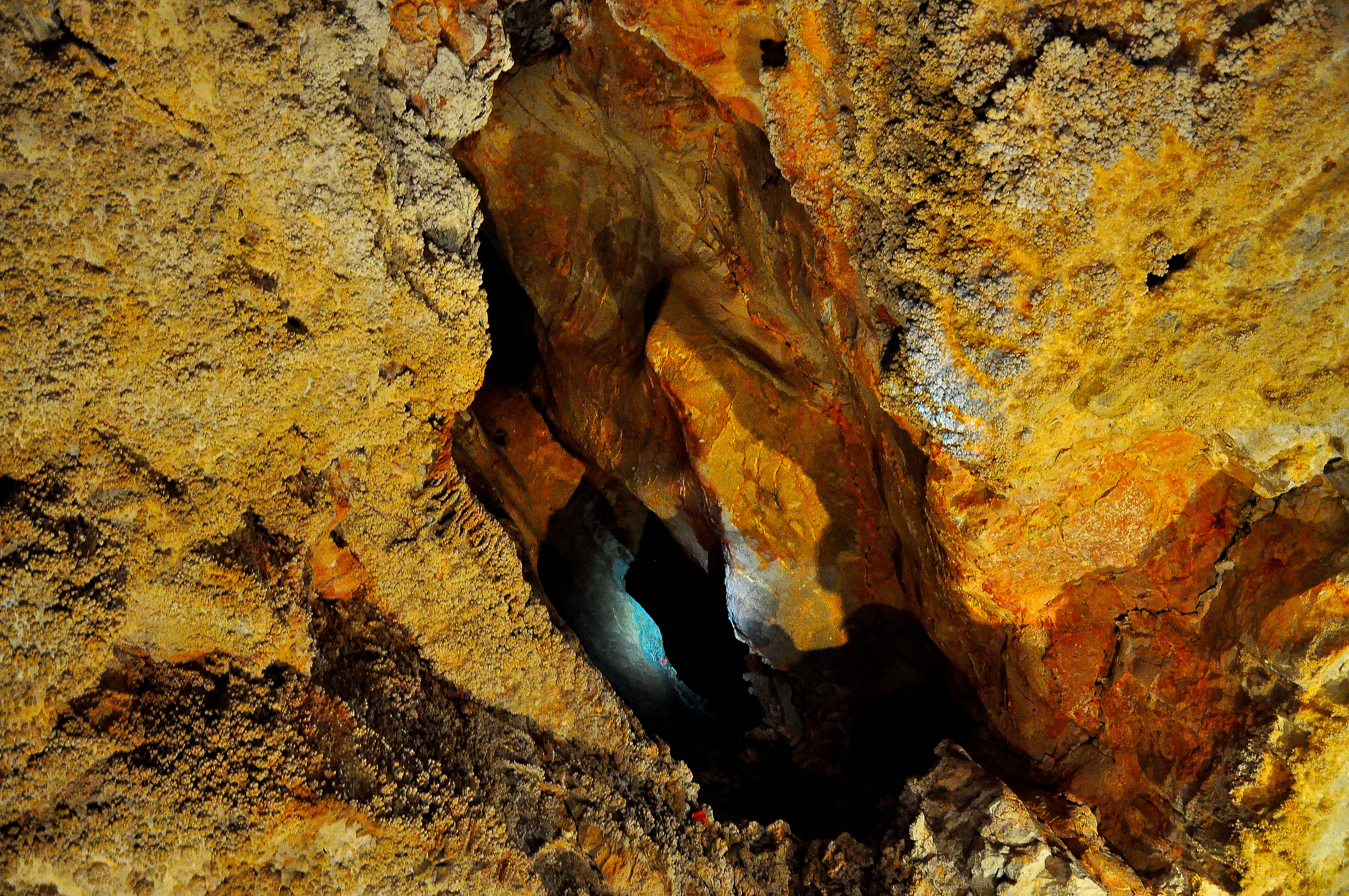
Colorful rock formations

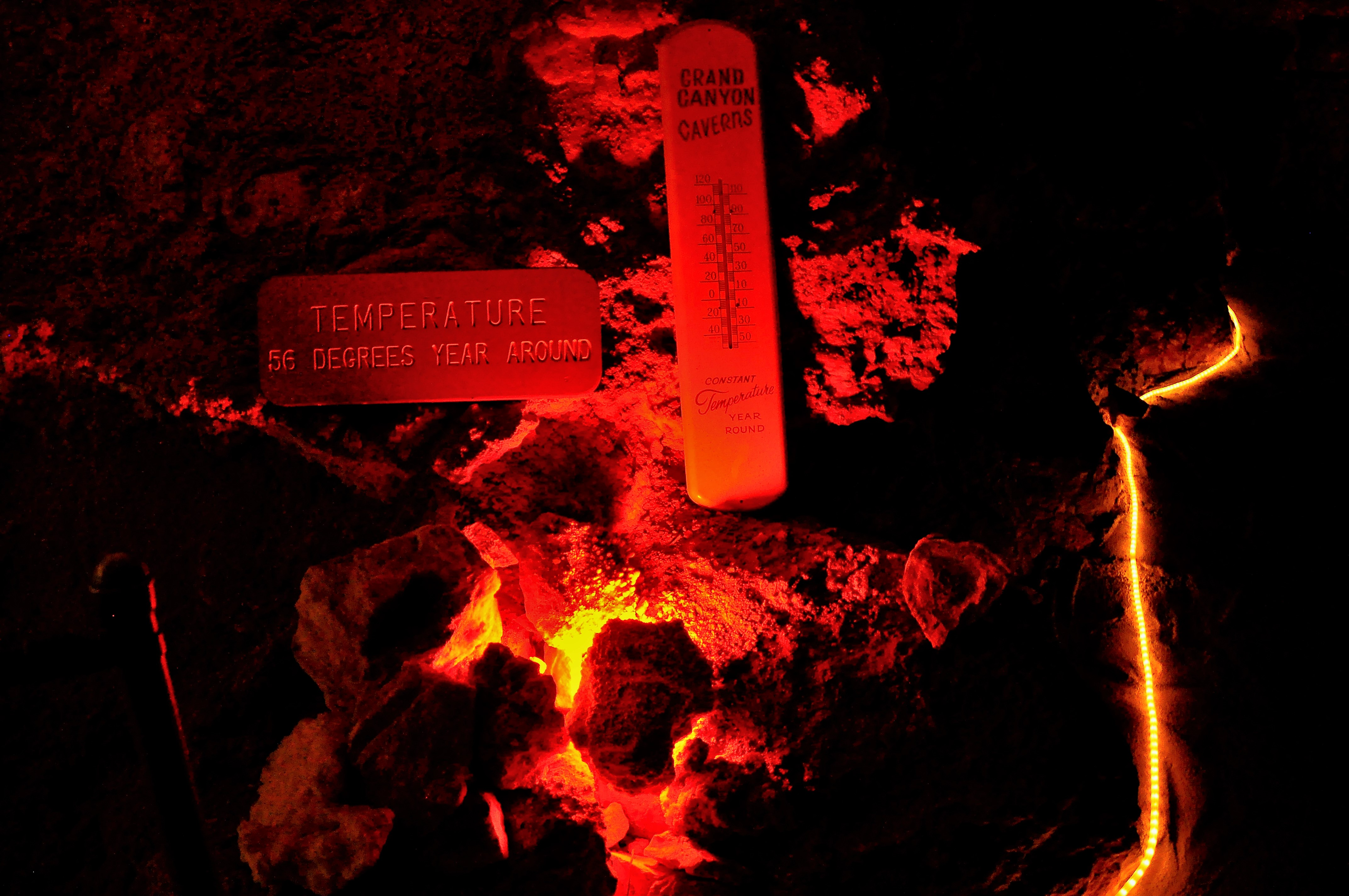
Constant temperature

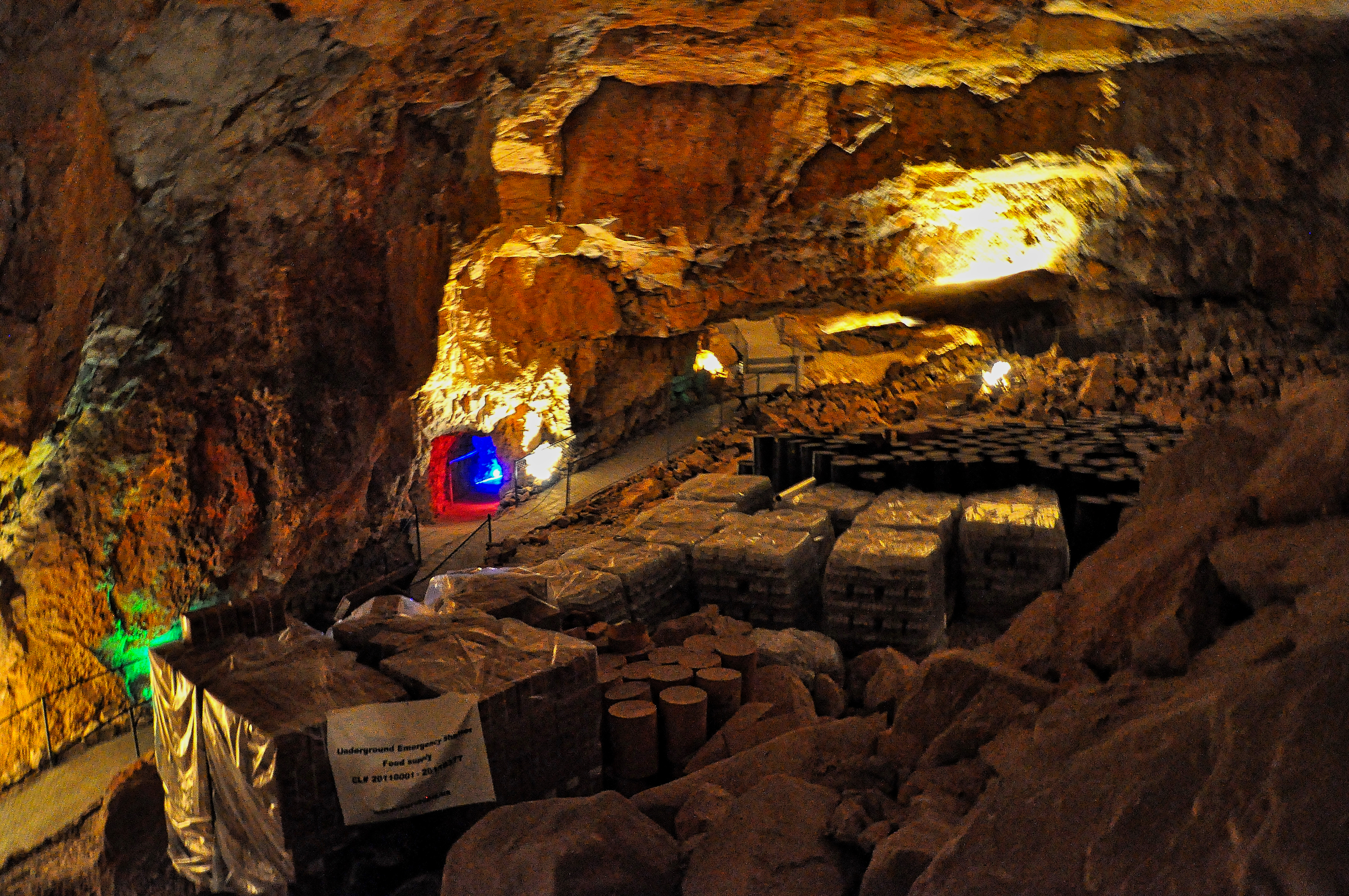
Cold War supply depot

== Features ==
The area includes a hotel, (The Grand Canyon Caverns Inn), an RV park, campgrounds, a restaurant, a convenience store, and a 5,100-foot (1,600 m) runway.

== Geology ==
Located on the Coconino Plateau, a few miles west of the Aubrey Cliffs that rise to over 6,100 feet (1,900 m) above sea level, the Caverns lie within an alluvial plain at an elevation of about 5,300 feet (1,600 m). Limestone comprises the majority of the subsurface area of this vicinity of the Coconino Plateau, an area riddled with numerous cavernous veins that run for miles in all directions.

== See also ==
- Grand Canyon Caverns Airport
- Arizona State Route 66
