= Grand Canyon Caverns Airport =

Airport in Coconino County, Arizona

Coordinates: 35°31′37″N 113°14′51″W

- IATA: PGS; ICAO: none; FAA LID: L37

Summary
- Airport type: Public
- Owner: Grand Canyon Caverns & Inn, LLC
- Serves: Peach Springs, Arizona
- Elevation AMSL: 5,386 ft (1,642 m)

Map
- Location within Arizona Location within the United States

Runways
Direction	Length		Surface
Direction	ft	m	Surface
5/23	5,100	1,554	Gravel
- Source: Federal Aviation Administration

Grand Canyon Caverns Airport (IATA: PGS, FAA LID: L37) is a public-use airport located 9 miles (7.8 nmi; 14 km) east of the central business district of Peach Springs, in Coconino County, Arizona, United States. The airport is privately owned by Grand Canyon Caverns & Inn, LLC.

== Facilities ==
Grand Canyon Caverns Airport covers an area of 800 acres (320 ha) and contains one gravel surface runway:

- 5/23 measuring 5,100 x 45 ft (1,554 x 14 m)

== See also ==
- Grand Canyon Caverns
- List of airports in Arizona
