= The Alligator (Grand Canyon) =

Landform

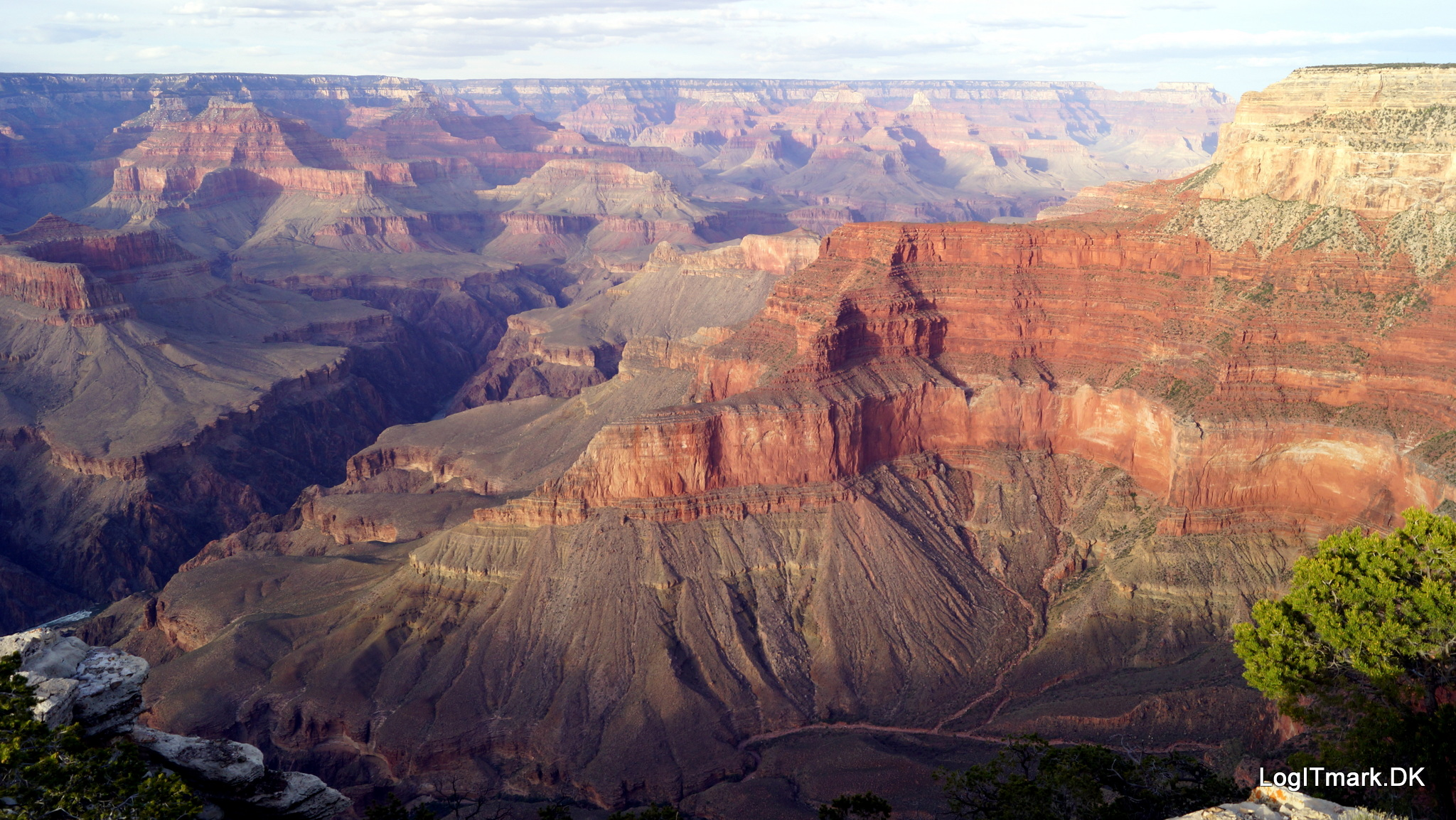
- The Alligator & Mohave Point (view eastwards)

Highest point
- Elevation: 5,774 ft (1,760 m)
- Prominence: 1,100 ft (340 m)
- Parent peak: Mohave Point (7,974 ft)
- Isolation: ~0.50
- Coordinates: 36.0797°N 112.1693°W

Geography
- Location within Arizona
- Location: Grand Canyon; Coconino County, Arizona. U.S.
- Parent range: Coconino Plateau; Colorado Plateau
- Topo map: USGS Grand Canyon

Geology
- Rock age: Permian-Pennsylvanian-(prominence) down to Proterozoic
- Mountain type: sedimentary down to Proterozoic rocks
- Rock types: Esplanade Sandstone horizontal platform (unit 4), (complete Supai Group on platform of Redwall Limestone) and Supai Group, Redwall Limestone, (Tonto Group- 3-units) _3-Muav Limestone, _2-Bright Angel Shale, _1-Tapeats Sandstone, Vishnu Basement Rocks

The Alligator (Grand Canyon), is a 5,774-foot (1,760 m)-elevation summit, a large ridgeline butte, connected to, and below Mohave Point (South Rim), approximately 1.5 miles (2.4 km) northwest of Grand Canyon Village, Grand Canyon. The ridgeline trends north, and the lower elevation cliff, the tail of the alligator, turns northwest. The Alligator landform is about 1.0 mile (1.6 km) from the west-flowing Colorado River, and Granite Gorge. The Alligator lies between the Monument Creek (Grand Canyon) drainage, west, and the Salt Creek (Grand Canyon) drainage, east, both short, south tributaries to the Colorado.

The Alligator is composed of bright red-orange Supai Group (four members), (cliffs, and slopes), upon a red, Redwall Limestone, large cliff. Also being a cliff-former, the curving "tail-of-the-alligator" is a flat-topped platform of the Redwall Limestone.

== Geology ==
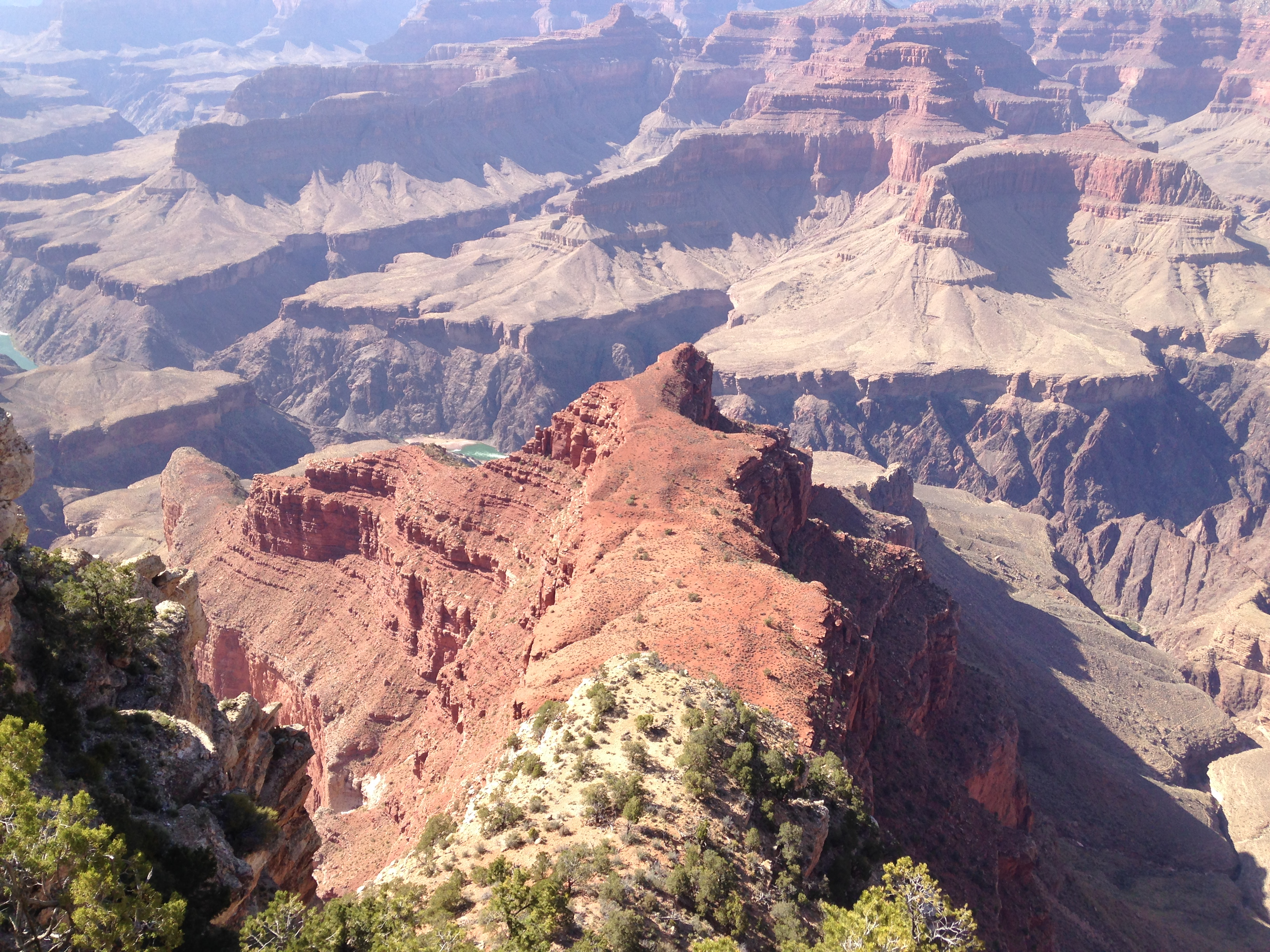
Looking down the upper Esplanade Sandstone, from Mohave Point

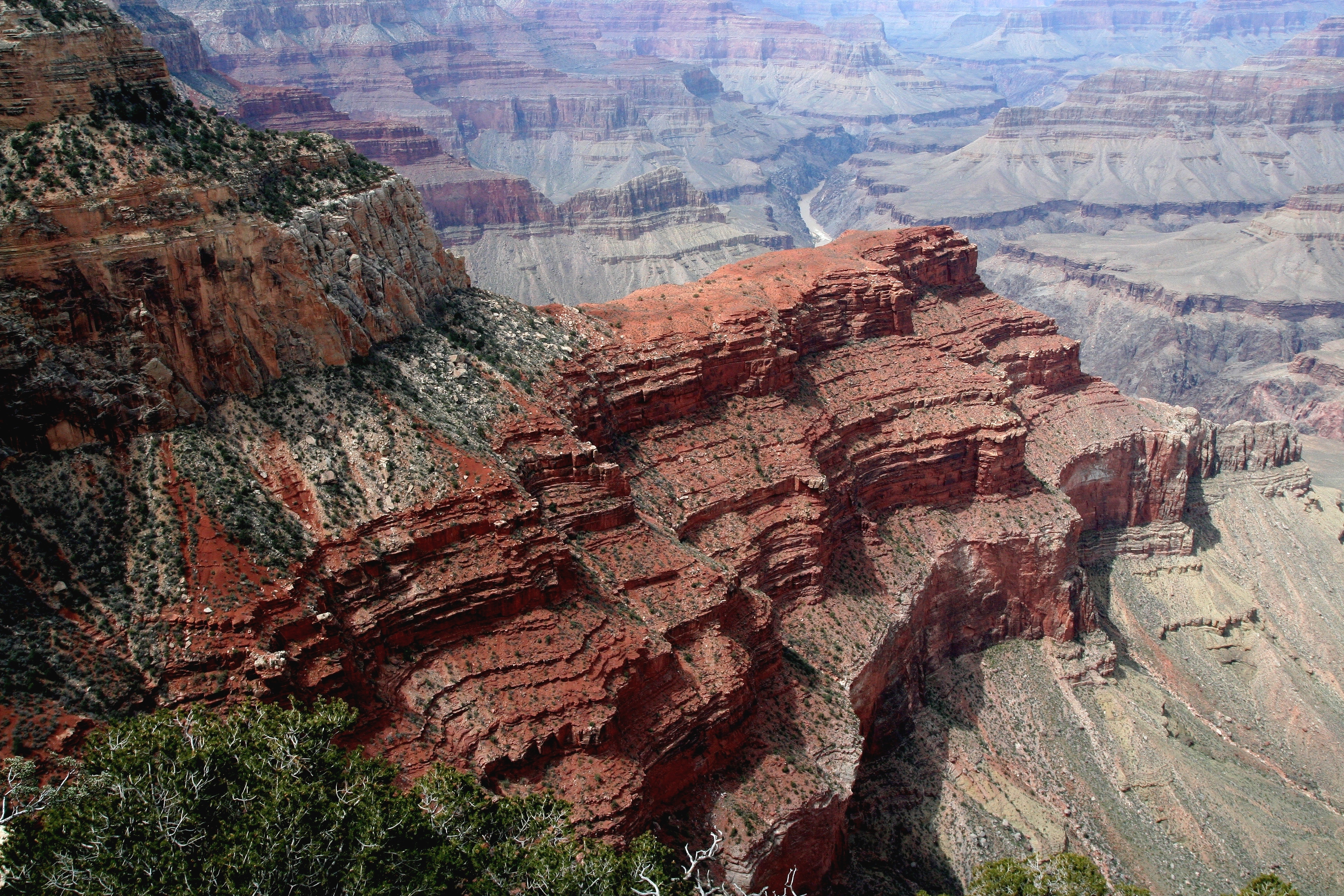
The Alligator seen from Hopi Point

The Alligator landform is composed of two basic rock units: the prominence-Supai Group (roughly 1,100 ft; 340 m thick), and below, Redwall Limestone (approximately 800 ft; 240 m thick). Because both are cliff-formers (and therefor shelf-formers), the high-point of The Alligator is on the upper platform (shelf) of the Supai Group, the highly resistant Esplanade Sandstone. The curved tail of The Alligator is the bottom platform, sitting on top of the highly resistant Redwall Limestone. As the tail curves, a smaller, secondary cliff-platform (above the Redwall), is composed of Supai unit 2, the also resistant Manakacha Formation. (The Redwall base, also sits on a shorter cliff (and platform), of Tonto Group, no. 3, the Muav Limestone). The rest of the Tonto Group sits on the Granite Gorge at the Colorado River with the walls of Vishnu Basement Rocks.
