= Aubrey Cliffs =

Cliff escarpments in Coconino County, Arizona, US

Coordinates: 35.56°N 113.05°W

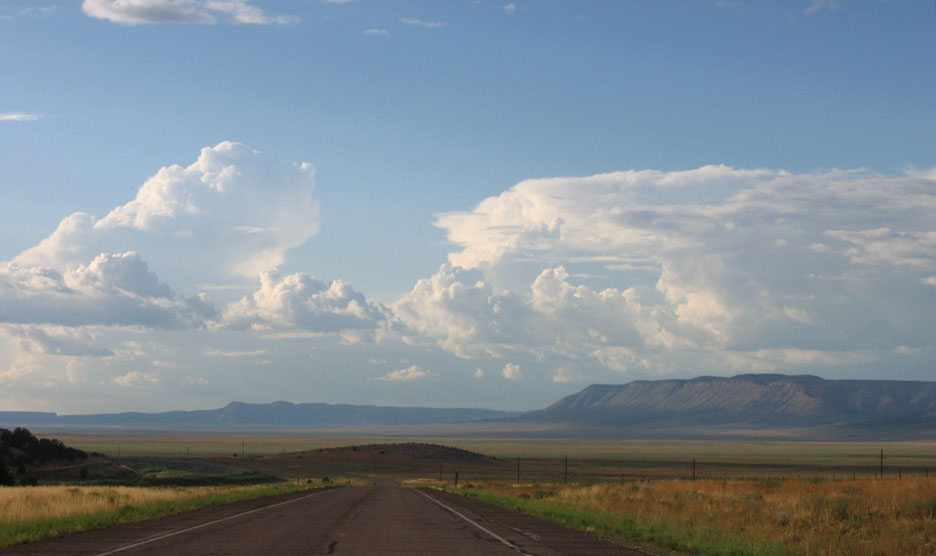
Southern terminus of the Aubrey Cliffs, in the northeastern Aubrey Valley. View to north from historic U.S. Route 66−(Arizona Route 66)

Aubrey Cliffs are a series of cliff escarpments located in Coconino County, in northwestern Arizona.

== Geology ==
The Toroweap Fault, west of Aubrey Valley in the south, and of Prospect Valley in the northwest, formed the Aubrey Cliffs. The cliffs form part of the southwest perimeter of the Coconino Plateau. The Toroweap Fault separates from the Hurricane Fault-(Hurricane Cliffs), at the Colorado River, in the western Grand Canyon. Both faults continue northeast, and northwest into southern Utah.

== Geography ==
The Aubrey Cliffs begin near Route 66 about five miles west of Seligman and run generally north to the Colorado River in the Grand Canyon (coordinates ranging from 35.35, -112.95 to 36.19, -113.02). The most prominent section is southern half, which overlooks the Aubrey Valley to the west and rises approximately 1,000 feet (300 m) above the valley floor to an elevation of about 6,300 feet (1,900 m). It is located on the Big Boquillas Ranch, a checkerboard area of state trust land and fee land owned by the Navajo Nation.

The northern half overlooks Prospect Valley and is located on the Hualapai Indian Reservation.

Proposed development

The southern cliffs are the site of a proposed 85 megawatt wind farm being developed by the Navajo Nation.
