= Hermit Canyon =

Landform in the Grand Canyon, Arizona

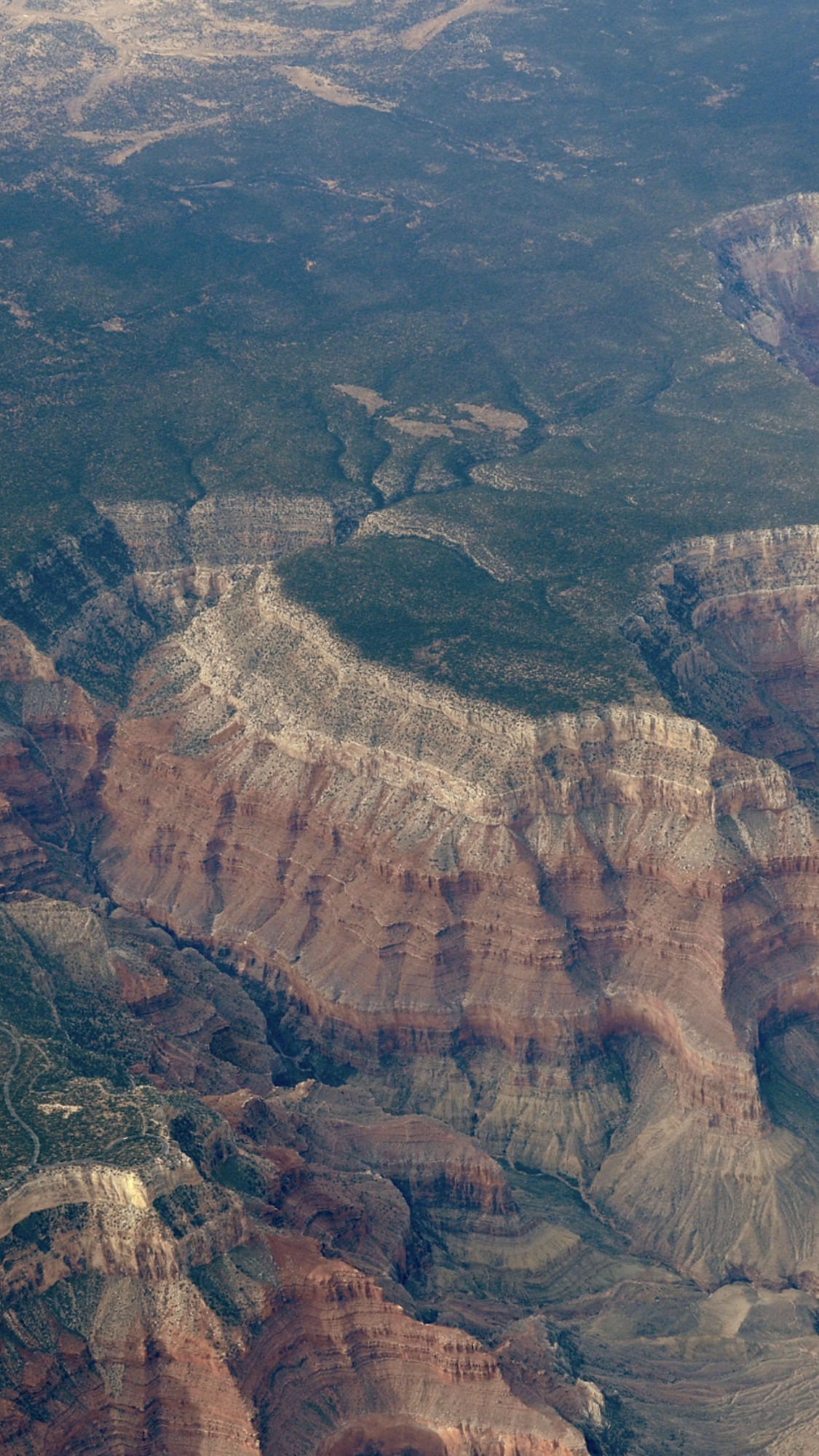
- Hermit Canyon (Pima Point-(bottom-left), (forested)-Eremita Mesa-(center)) (Eremita Mesa, Spanish for “Hermit Mesa”)

- Location within Arizona
- Floor elevation: 4,928 ft (1,502 m)
- Length: ~6.0 mi southwest-northeast
- Width: ~4.0 mi

Geography
- Location: (west)-Grand Canyon, (northern)-Arizona, United States
- Borders on: Eremita Mesa-(west); South Rim (Pima Point)-(east)
- Coordinates: 36°04′05″N 112°12′50″W
- Topo map: Grand Canyon, USGS
- Rivers: 1_Hermit Creek; 2_Dripping Springs tributary-(southwest); 3_Horsethief Tank tributary-(south and southeast)
- Interactive map of Hermit Canyon

Hermit Canyon is a north-trending canyon in western Grand Canyon, about 6.0 miles in length, below the South Rim. It is named for the hermit who built Hermit Camp, at the Colorado River, Louis D. Boucher. Hermit Canyon's east flank is bordered by Pima Point of the South Rim (about at the canyon midpoint), and Pima Point is ~2.0 from the Hermit Canyon midline. Pima Point is about 3.5 miles west-northwest of Grand Canyon Village, and the South Rim at Pima Point trends southward, as the start of Western Grand Canyon; it also marks the terminus of the West Rim Road.

Hermit Canyon contains the Hermit Basin at its southern end, with Dripping Springs (and Dripping Springs Trail to the west). The Hermit Trail traverses the east flank of Hermit Canyon down to the Colorado River, where it intersects the Tonto Trail at Cope Butte. At the end of Hermit Creek, and Canyon, the Hermit Rapids interrupt the flow of the Colorado River. Historic Hermit Camp was located at the end of the Hermit Trail, near the Colorado River.

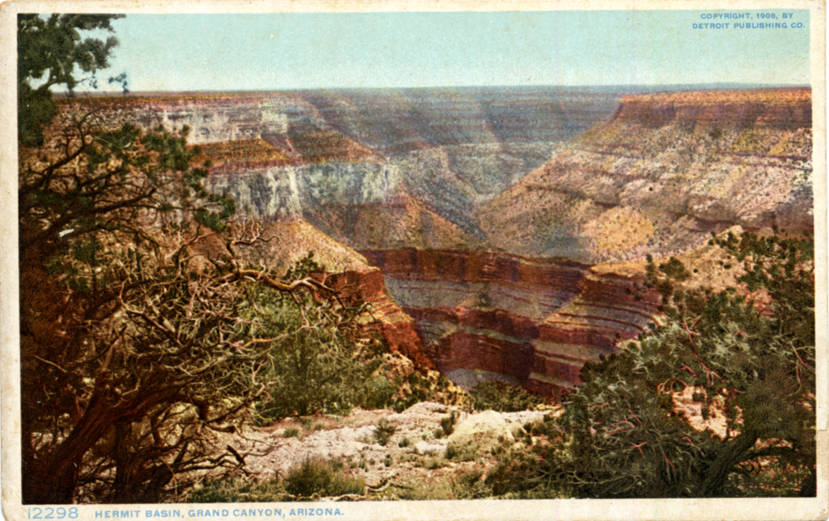
Hermit Basin, postcard (c 1908)

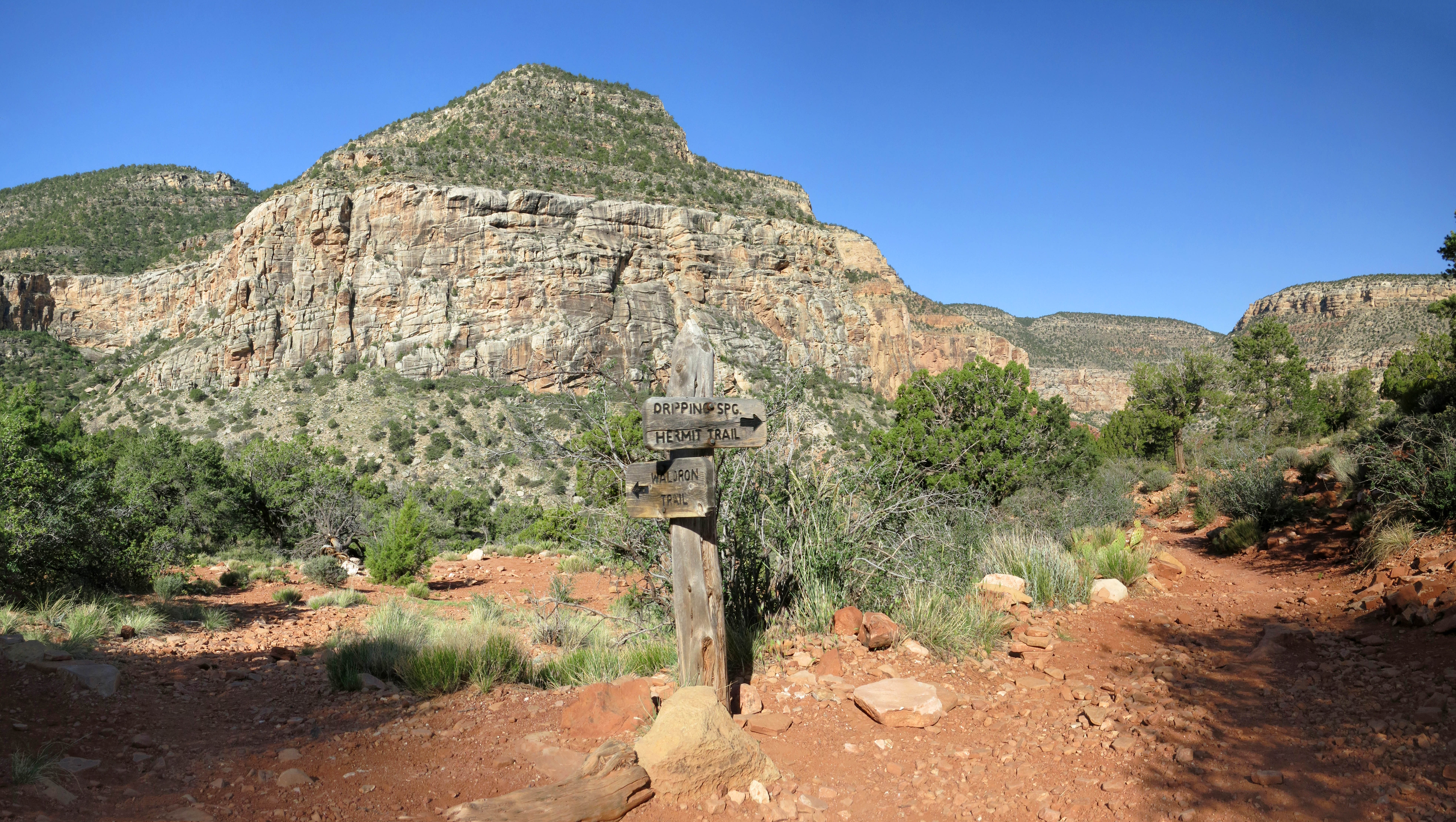
(Upper)-Hermit Canyon, Hermit Basin, Waldron Trail to Horsethief Tank, on South Rim.

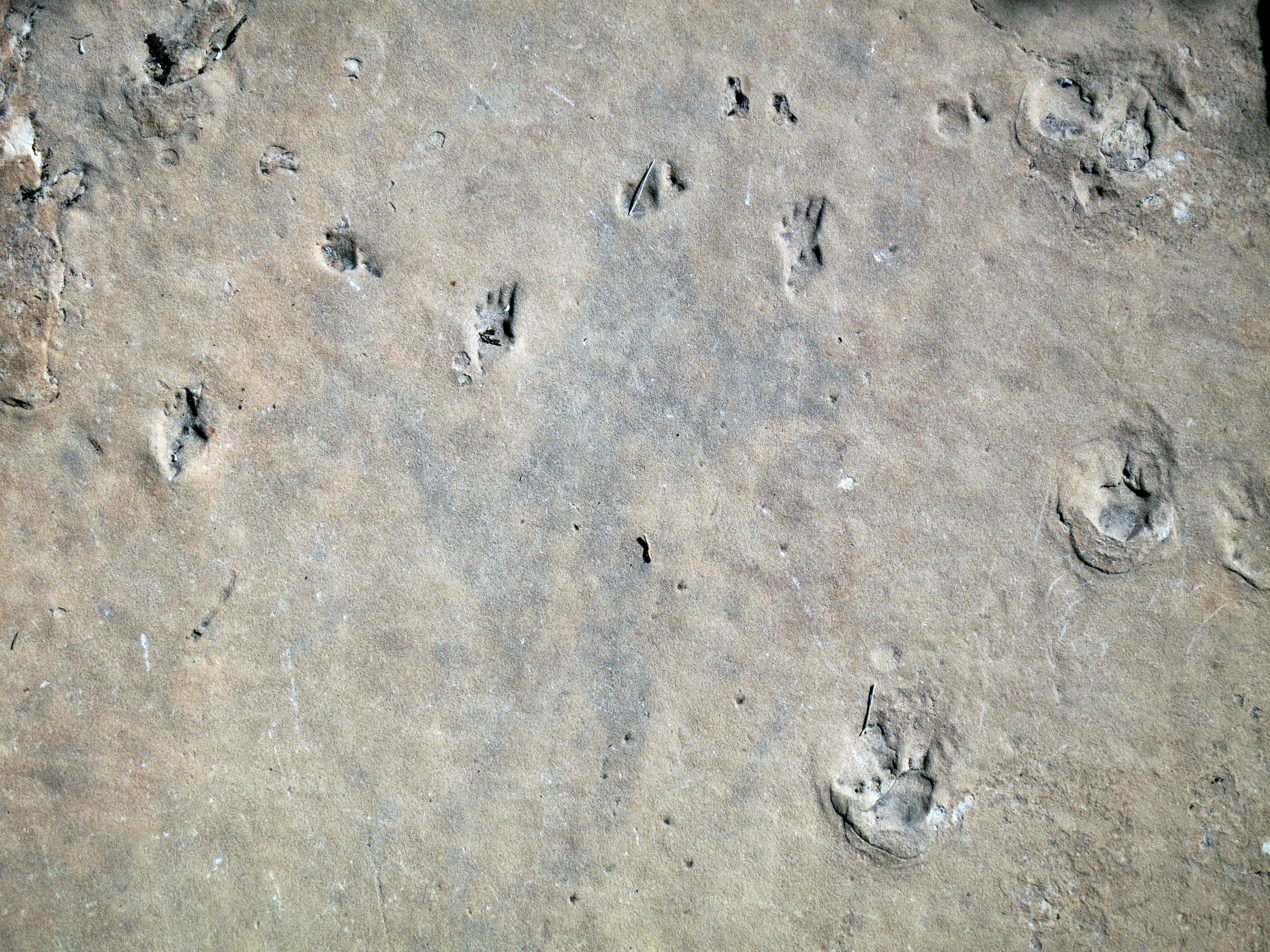
Fossil trackways, public display on Hermit Trail

== Gallery ==
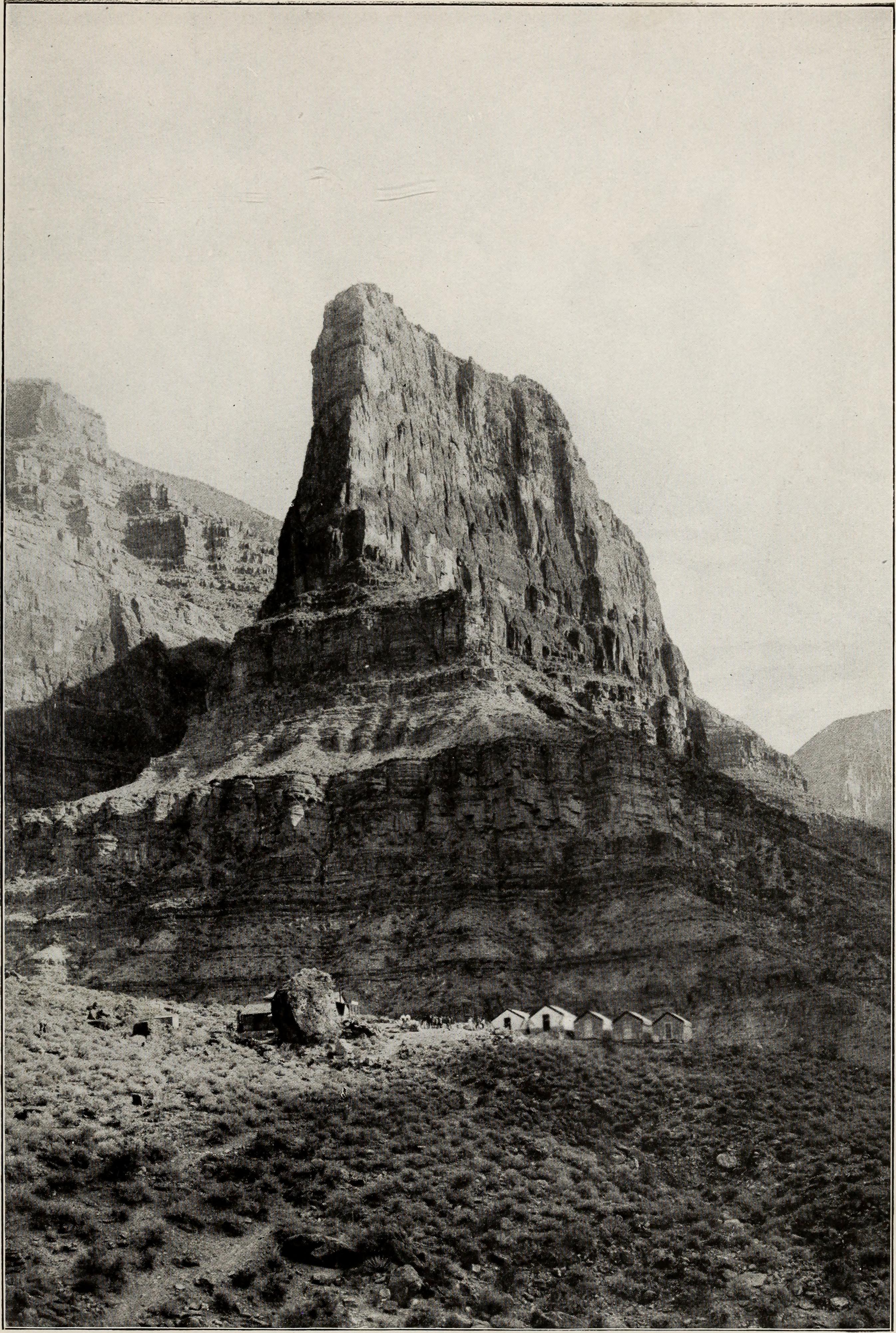
Hermit Camp buildings at the prominence base, region of Granite Gorge, at terminus of Hermit Canyon

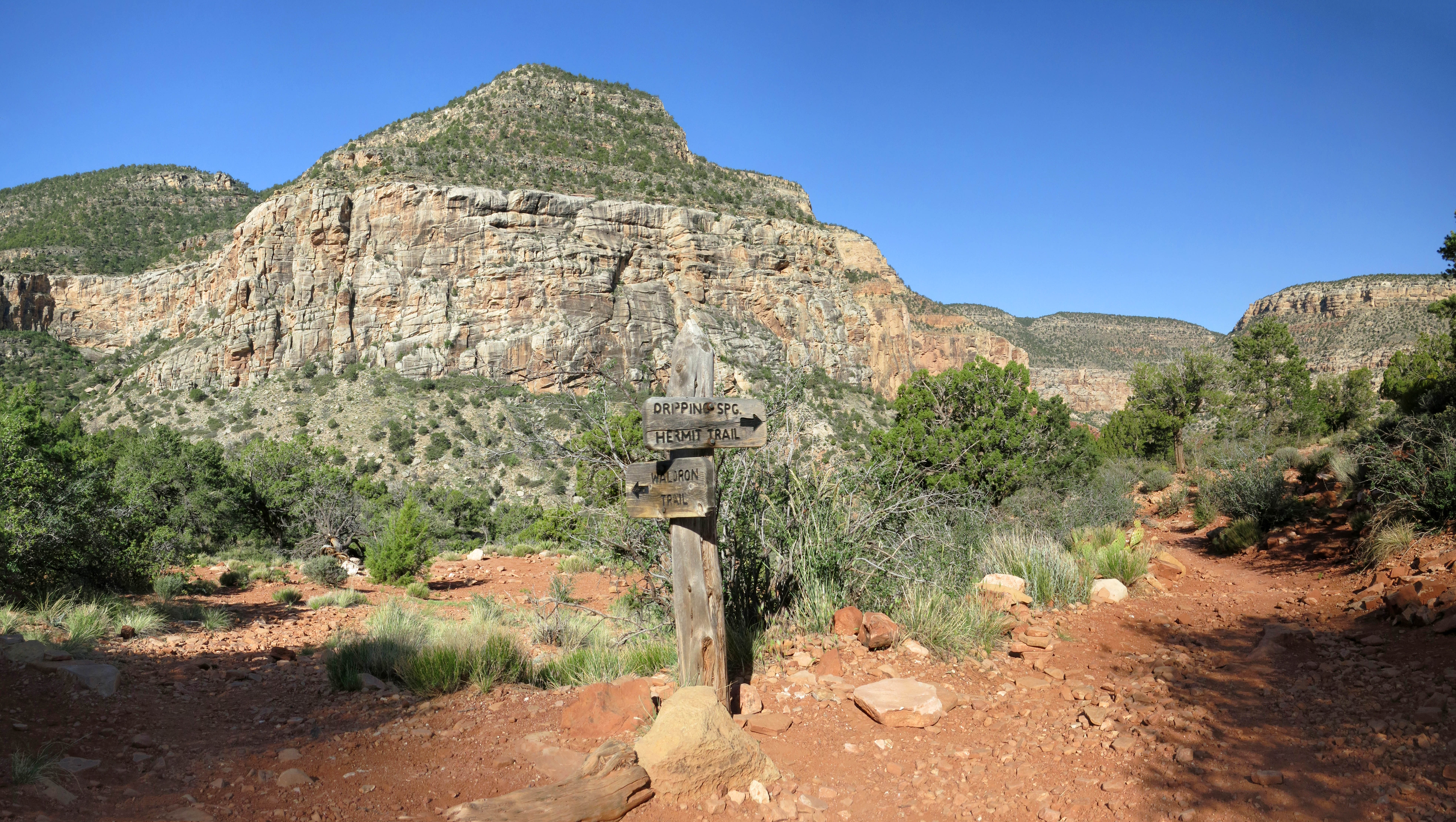
(Upper)-Hermit Canyon, Hermit Basin, Waldron Trail to Horsethief Tank, on South Rim.

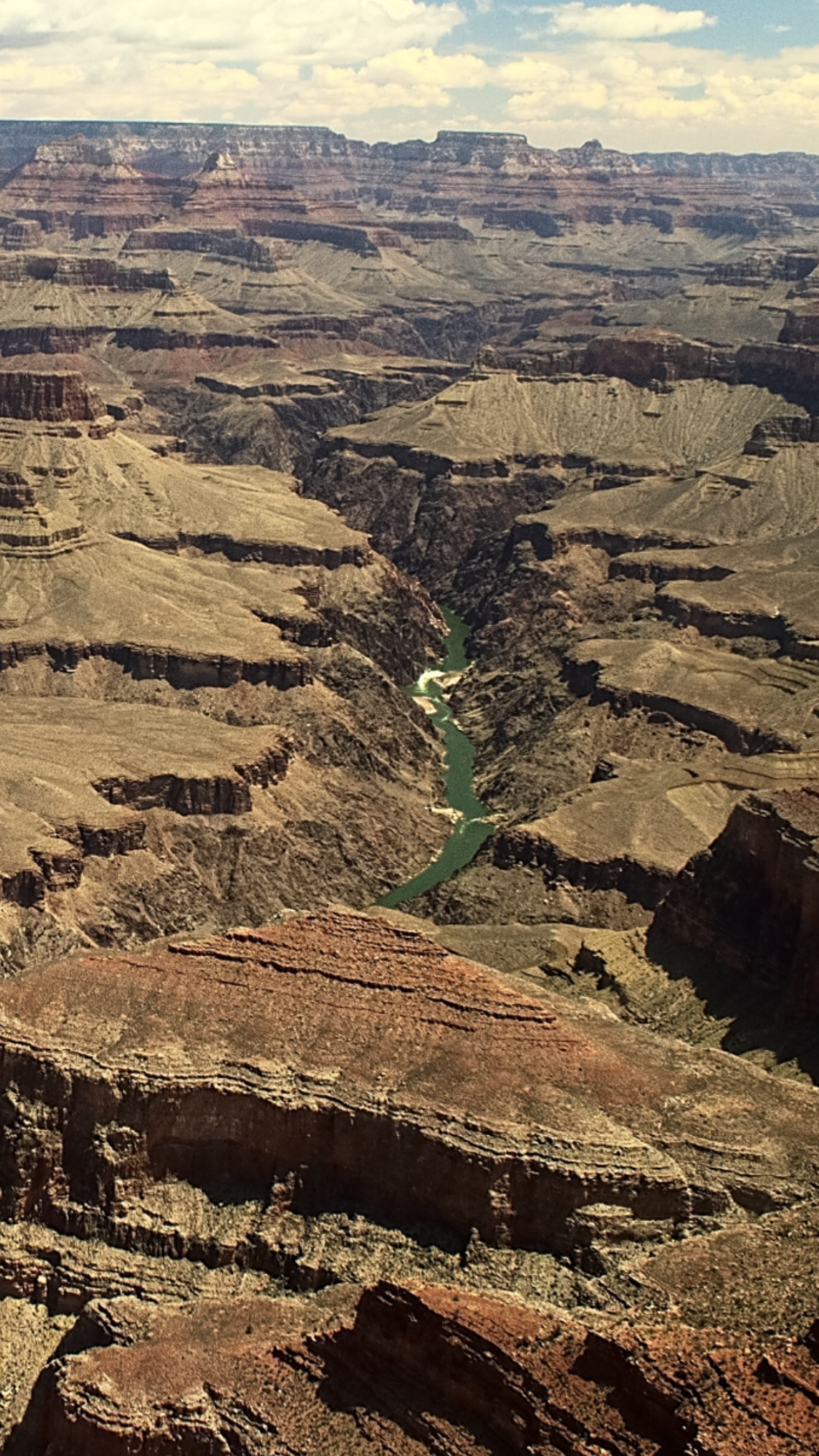
Hermit Rapids, viewed upstream over Whites Butte

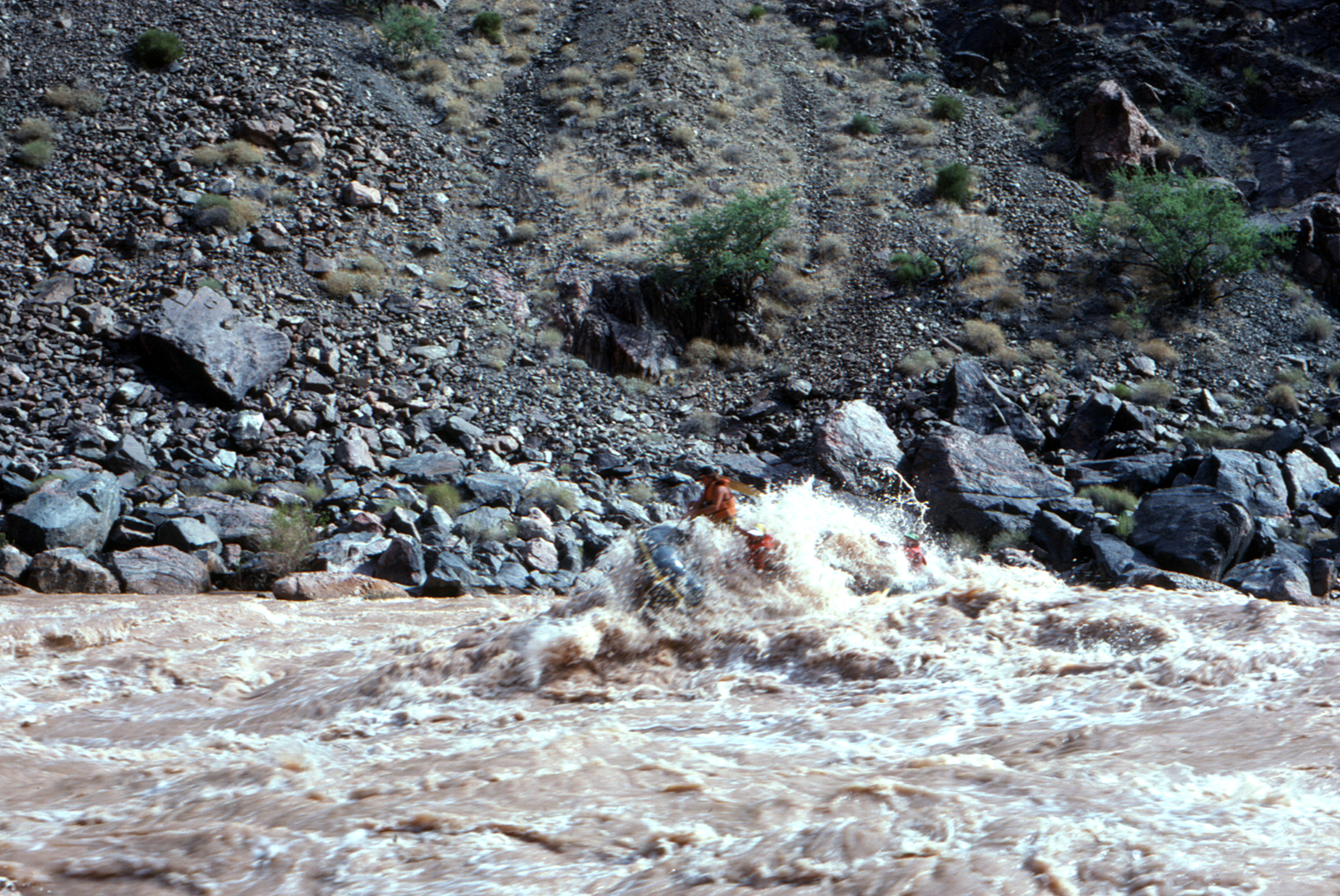

== See also ==
- Hermits Rest
- Geology of the Grand Canyon area
