= Frazier Wells, Arizona =

- Populated place
- Location within the state of Arizona Frazier Wells (the United States)
- Coordinates: 35°46′57″N 113°04′20″W
- Country: United States
- State: Arizona
- County: Coconino
- Elevation: 6,047 ft (1,843 m)
- Time zone: UTC-7 (Mountain (MST))
  - Summer (DST): UTC-7 (MST)
- Area code: 928
- FIPS code: 04-25695
- GNIS feature ID: 4832

Frazier Wells, sometimes known as Frazier Well or Fraziers Well, is a populated place situated in Coconino County, Arizona, United States, located approximately 30 miles northeast of Peach Springs. It has an estimated elevation of 6,047 feet (1,843 m) above sea level.

Frazier Wells has been the site of the Hualapai Rodeo. It was also the site of a sawmill, which was unsuccessful and closed by 1951.

Circa 1951, the Frazier Wells school was operationally handed over to the state per a U.S. Bureau of Indian Affairs grant.
