= Vulcan's Throne =

Landform in the Grand Canyon, Arizona

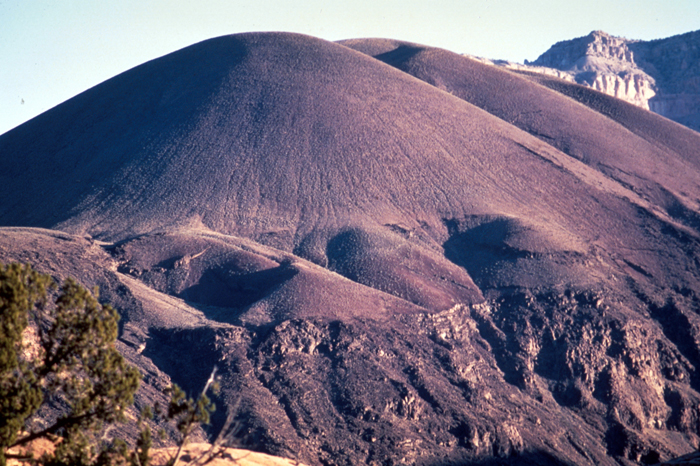

Highest point
- Elevation: 5,102 ft (1,555 m) NGVD 29
- Coordinates: 36°13′08″N 113°04′39″W

Geography
- Location within Arizona
- Location: Grand Canyon National Park; Mohave County, Arizona. U.S.
- Topo map: USGS Vulcans Throne

Geology
- Rock age: 73,000 years
- Mountain type: Cinder cone
- Volcanic field: Uinkaret volcanic field

Vulcan's Throne is a cinder cone volcano and a prominent landmark on the North Rim of the Grand Canyon in Arizona, United States. The volcano is adjacent the Colorado River, (thousands of feet above the river) as it is the source material for Lava Falls and Lava Falls Rapids (Vulcan Rapids) one of the largest rapids of the Colorado. Vulcan's Throne, about a mile (1.7 km) west of Toroweap overlook, is part of the Uinkaret volcanic field. The journals of traveler George Corning Fraser record a trip to the summit of Vulcan's Throne in 1914. At the time, the surrounding area was used for sheep grazing, and a small reservoir had been constructed at the base of the volcano. Fraser wrote that

Vulcan's Throne is a pure cinder cone covered with scoriae, cinders, clinkers and peperino lying loose on the surface, with a slope, as near as I could measure, from 28° to 31°. A little sage, many cacti and perhaps some other similar low plants grow on it, but otherwise nothing. Climbing it was like ascending a sand-dune. Every step forward involved slipping half way back and boots were soon filled with painful bits of stone.

— George Corning Fraser, 17 July 1914, Journeys in the Canyon Lands of Utah and Arizona, 1914 - 1916, pp 25-26

The cinder cone was formed during the Quaternary Period, and is cut by recent movement on the Toroweap Fault.

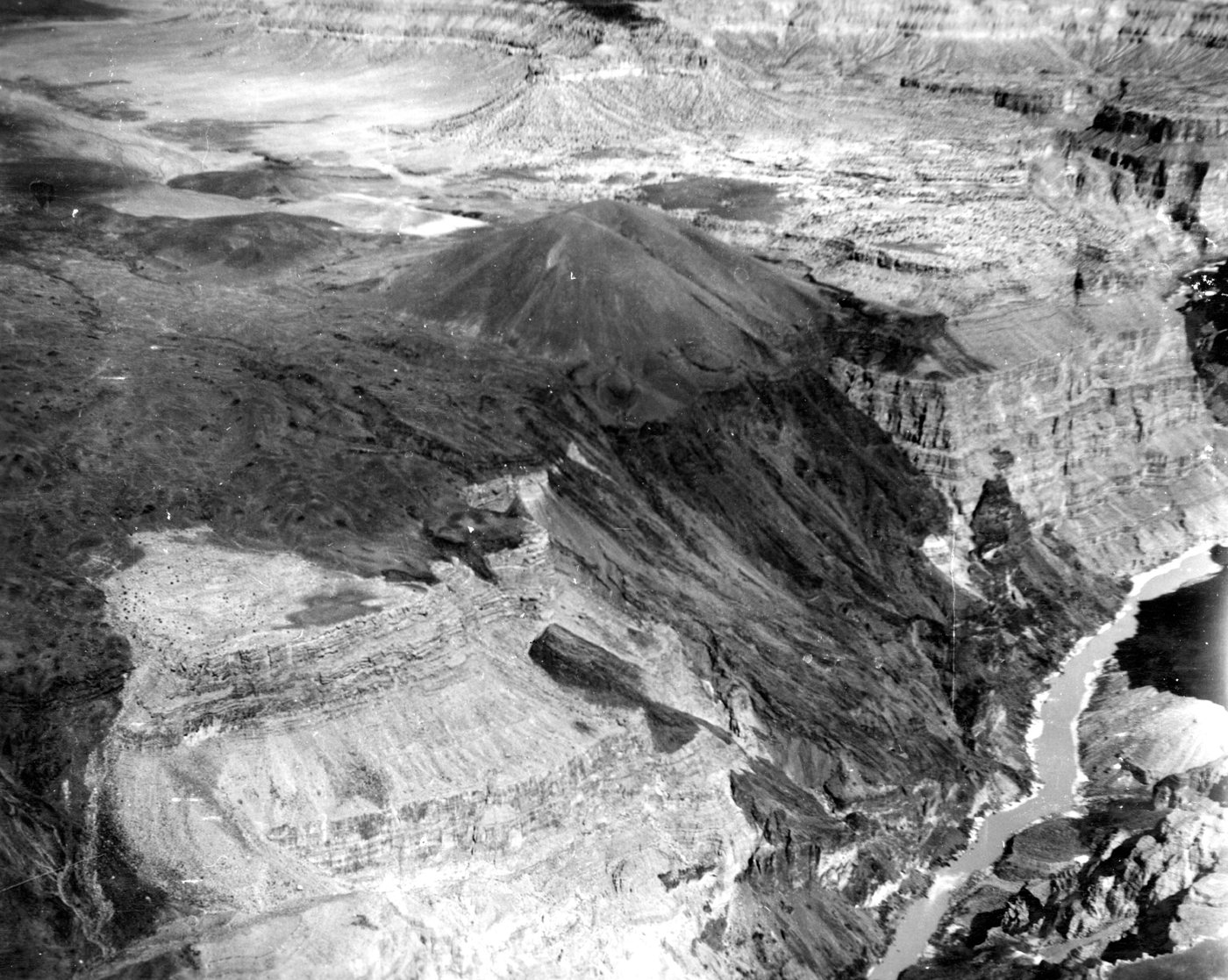
Vulcan’s Throne, Lava Falls, and Lava Falls Rapids (view looking upriver, approximately to northeast)

The damming of the Colorado River by the lava from Vulcan’s Throne, produced major rapids. The Lava Falls Rapids are so large that they can be heard on certain days, from the adjacent overlook of Toroweap Point.

== Lava Falls Rapids ==
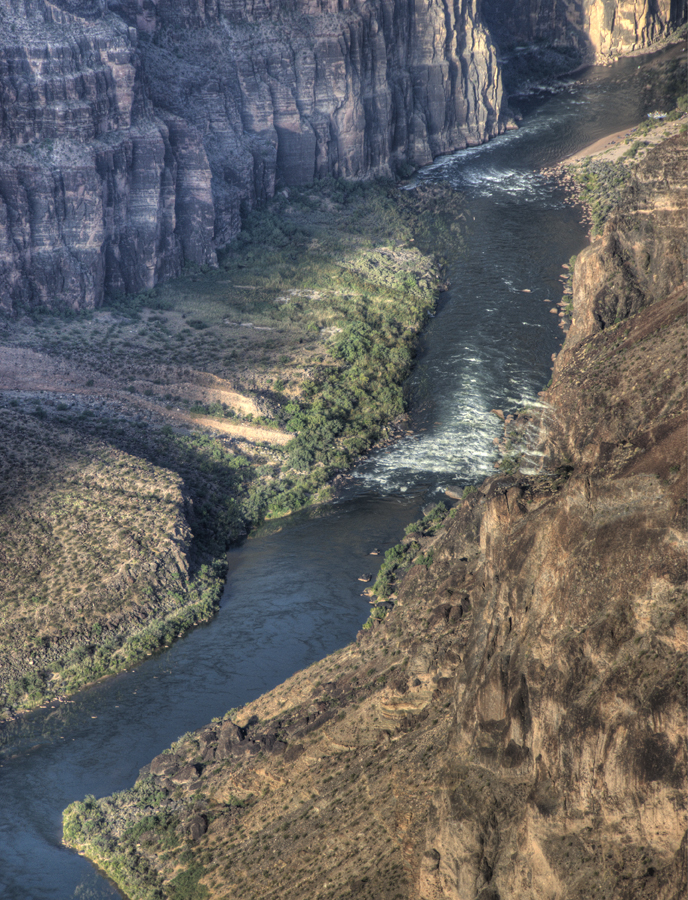
(Enlarged) view looking downstream from Toroweap Point region

== See also ==
- List of volcanoes in the United States
