= Uinkaret volcanic field =

Landform in northwestern Arizona

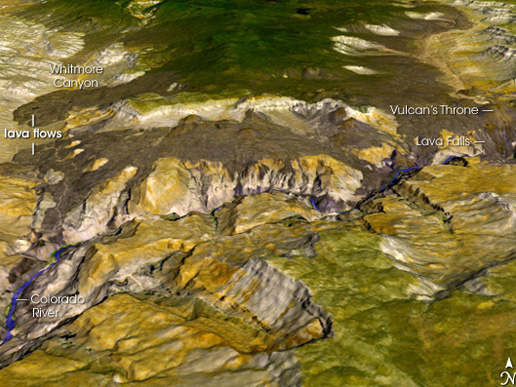

Highest point
- Elevation: 1,555 m (5,102 ft)
- Coordinates: 36°23′N 113°08′W

Geography
- Location: Mohave County, Arizona, US
- Topo map: USGS Mount Logan

Geology
- Rock age: 1.2 million years
- Mountain type: volcanic field
- Last eruption: 1100 ± 75 years

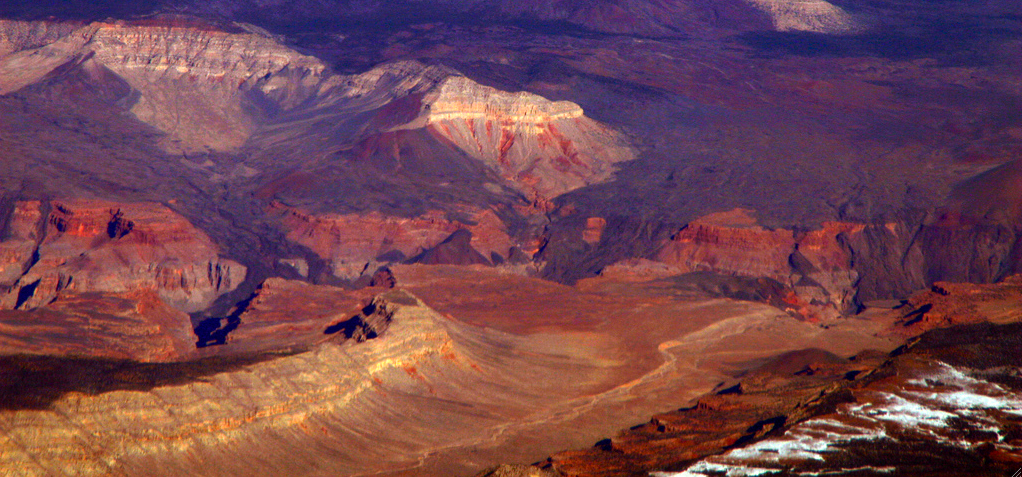
Basalts from the Uinkaret volcanic field flow into the Grand Canyon from its North Rim. On the right is Lava Falls, with Vulcan's Throne at the top, half visible along the right-hand edge of the photo. Vulcan's Throne is about 73,000 years old. These are among the most recent features of the Grand Canyon. The topmost layers over which the lava flowed, the Kaibab Limestone, was deposited in Early Permian time, around 290 million years ago.

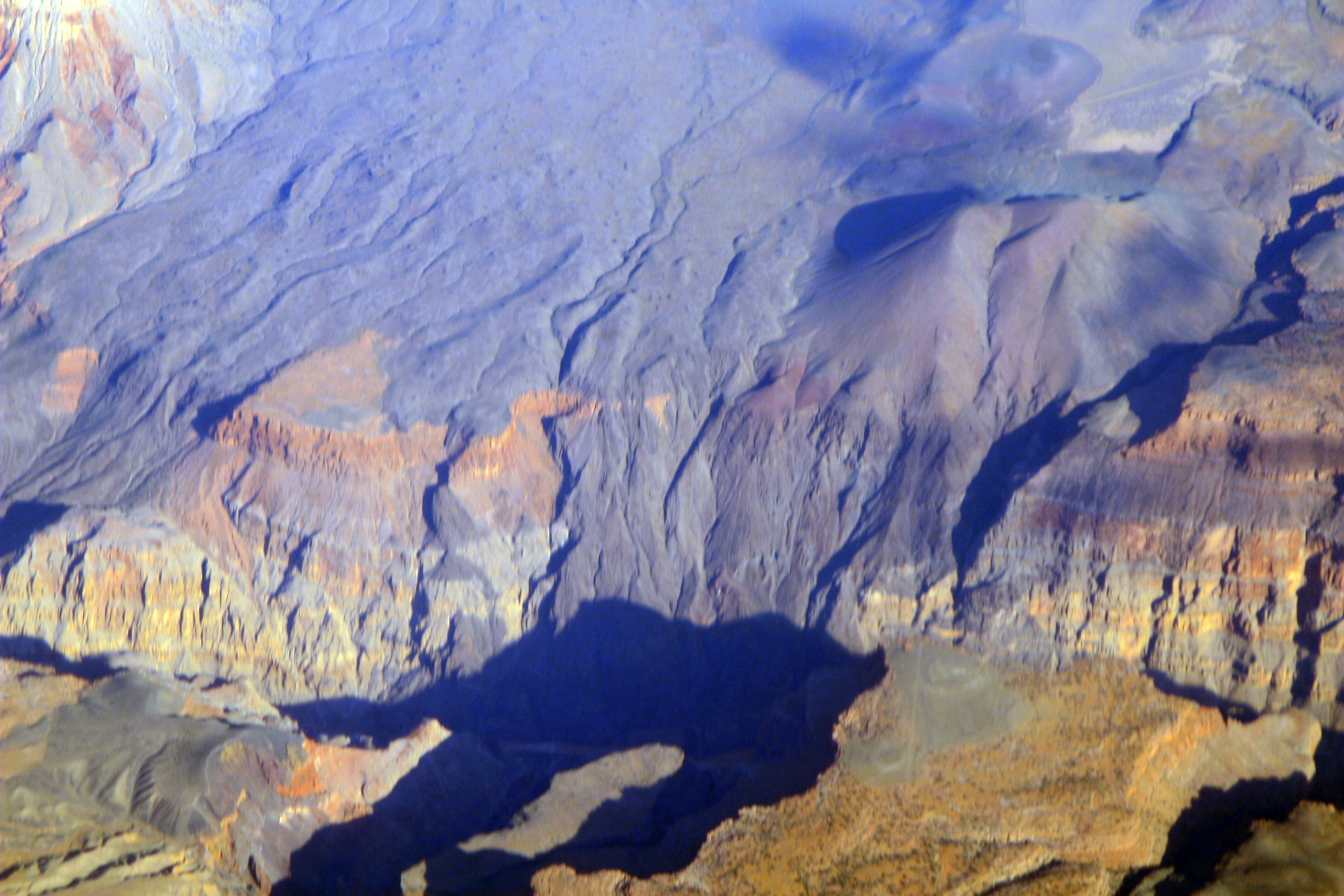
Vulcan's Throne (top right) and Lava Falls, 2008 aerial photo

The Uinkaret volcanic field is an area of monogenetic volcanoes in northwestern Arizona, United States, located on the north rim of the Grand Canyon.

Lava flows from the Uinkaret volcanic field that have cascaded down into the Grand Canyon, damming the Colorado River, have been used to date the canyon's carving. One of these cascades is today's Lava Falls. Lava Falls Rapid, below Lava Falls on the Colorado River, is "at all water levels, the most severe rapid in Grand Canyon."

The Colorado River was dammed by lava flows multiple times from 725,000 to 100,000 years ago. While some believe that these lava dams were stable, lasting up to 20,000 years and forming large reservoirs, others think they failed quickly and catastrophically as massive floods. Lava flows traveled downriver 76 miles (122 km) from river mile 178 to 254.

One lava flow, from Little Springs, south of Pliocene Mount Trumbull, has a cosmogenic helium age of 1300 ± 500 years BP. Pottery shards dated to between 1050 and 1200 CE were found within the lava flow, produced around the same time as the Sunset Crater eruption in the San Francisco volcanic field on the South Rim.

== Notable Vents ==
Name	Elevation		Location	Last eruption
Name	meters	feet	Coordinates	Last eruption
Mount Emma	-	-	-	-
Little Springs	-	-	-	1050–1200 AD
Prospect Cone	-	-	-	-
Mount Trumbull	-	-	-	-
Vulcan's Forge	-	-	-	-
Vulcan's Throne	-	-	-	73,000 years ago

== See also ==
- Geology of the Grand Canyon area
- List of volcanoes in the United States
- List of volcanic fields
