= Coconino Plateau =

Geographic feature in Coconino County, Arizona, US

Coordinates: 35°50′N 112°30′W

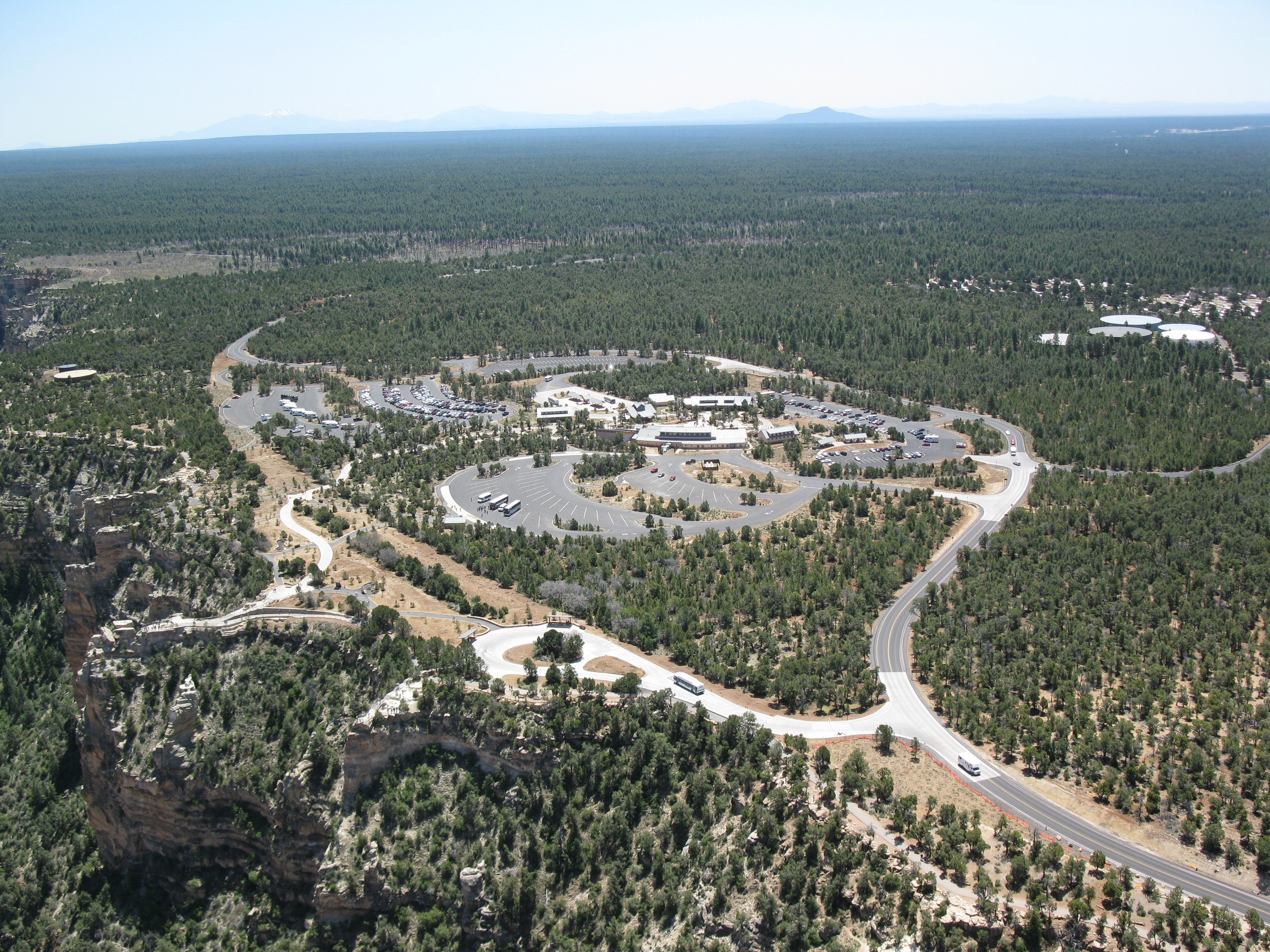
Grand Canyon Visitor Center on the South Rim of the Grand Canyon, and the Coconino Plateau beyond – in Grand Canyon National Park, Arizona.

The Coconino Plateau is found south of the Grand Canyon and north-northwest of Flagstaff, in northern Arizona of the Southwestern United States.

== Geography ==
The Coconino Plateau lies south of Grand Canyon Village and the South Rim of the Grand Canyon in Coconino County, and primarily north of Interstate 40 and east of Arizona State Route 64. Much of it is protected within the Kaibab National Forest.

== Vegetation ==
The native plant vegetation in the forest areas varies by elevation and exposure. Principal tree species are Ponderosa pine, Douglas-fir, pinyon pine, and juniper. They provide cover and food for a diversity of wildlife. As elevation decreases, trees give way to bitter brush (Purshia tridentata) and sagebrush (Artemisia tridentata).

== Recreation ==
A view of the plateau can be seen from the top of Kendrick Peak, at 10,418 feet (3,175 m) above sea level, located northwest of Flagstaff.

The Coconino Plateau is home to the Kendrick Mountain Wilderness area. The plateau has many hiking trails, including the Beale Road Historic Trail and Bull Basin and Pumpkin Trails.

== See also ==
- Kaibab Plateau
- Colorado Plateau
