= Tonto Trail =

Grand Canyon hiking trail

Coordinates: 36.0764°N 112.10655°W

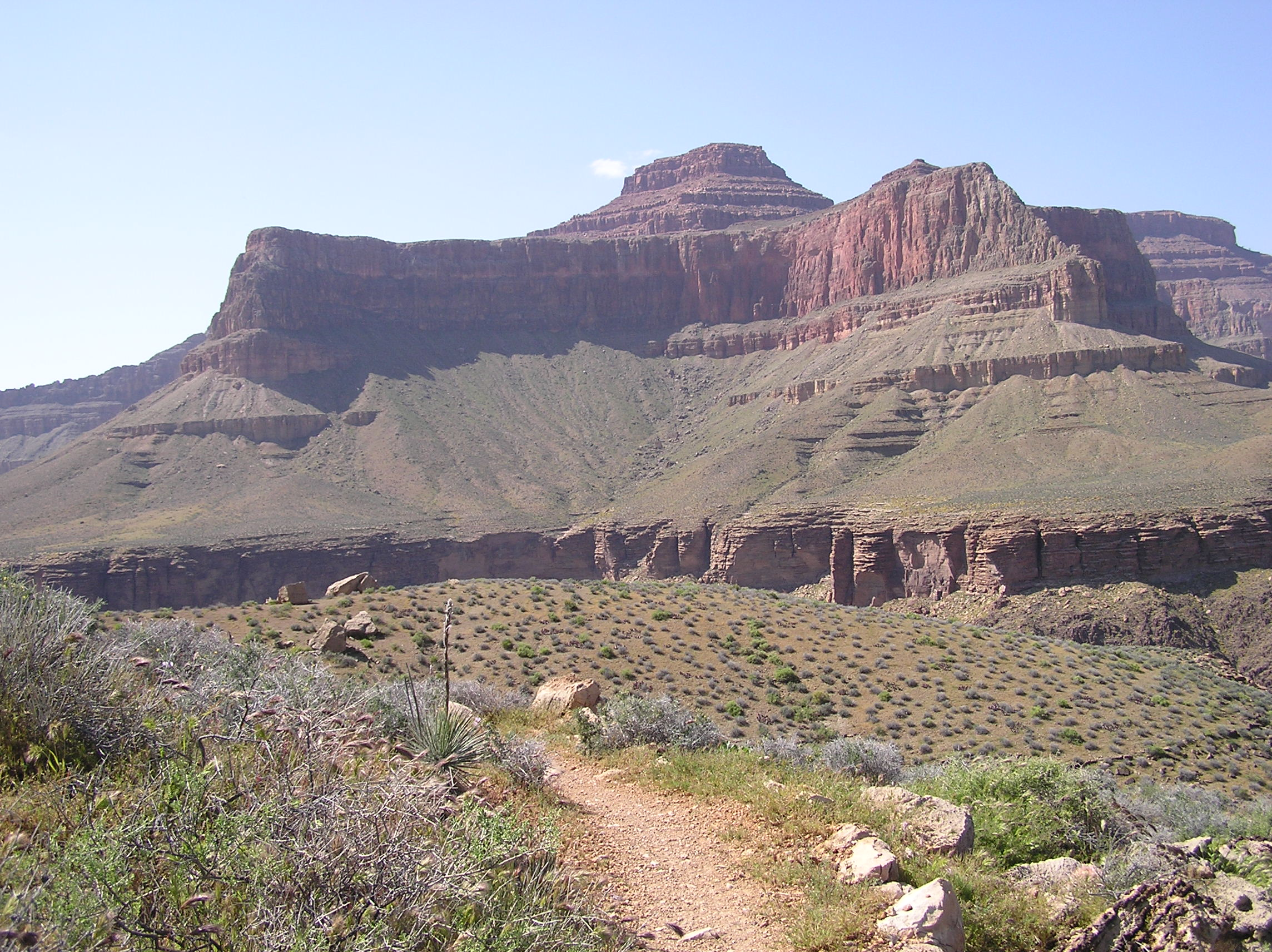
- Tower of Set from Tonto Trail, between Horn Creek and Salt Creek
- Length: 70 mi (110 km)
- Location: Grand Canyon National Park, Arizona, United States
- Trailheads: Garnet Canyon; Red Canyon
- Use: Hiking
- Difficulty: Moderate to Strenuous
- Season: Year Round
- Sights: Grand Canyon; Colorado River
- Hazards: Severe Weather; Overexertion; Dehydration; Flash Flood

The Tonto Trail is a hiking trail on the South Rim of the Grand Canyon in Grand Canyon National Park, located in the U.S. state of Arizona.

== Access ==
The Tonto Trail does not terminate at either rim of the Grand Canyon, but begins along the south bank of the Colorado River at Garnet Canyon (western end) and ends at Red Canyon (eastern end), also at the Colorado River. Through most of its 95-mile length, the trail runs along the Tonto Platform, the bench in the Grand Canyon that separates the inner gorge from the upper canyon. 95 miles (152.9 km): Garnet Canyon to Red Canyon

Approximate mileages between key points on the Tonto Trail:

- 11.6 miles (18.7 km): Garnet Creek to Bass Canyon
- 35.7 miles (57.5 km): Bass Canyon to Hermit Creek
- 12 miles (19.3 km): Hermit Creek to Bright Angel Trail (Indian Garden)
- 4.5 miles (7.2 km): Bright Angel Trail to South Kaibab Trail
- 21.3 miles (34.3 km): South Kaibab Trail to Grandview Trail (Horseshoe Mesa)
- 9.9 miles (15.9 km): Grandview Trail to New Hance Trail (Red Canyon)

== Description ==
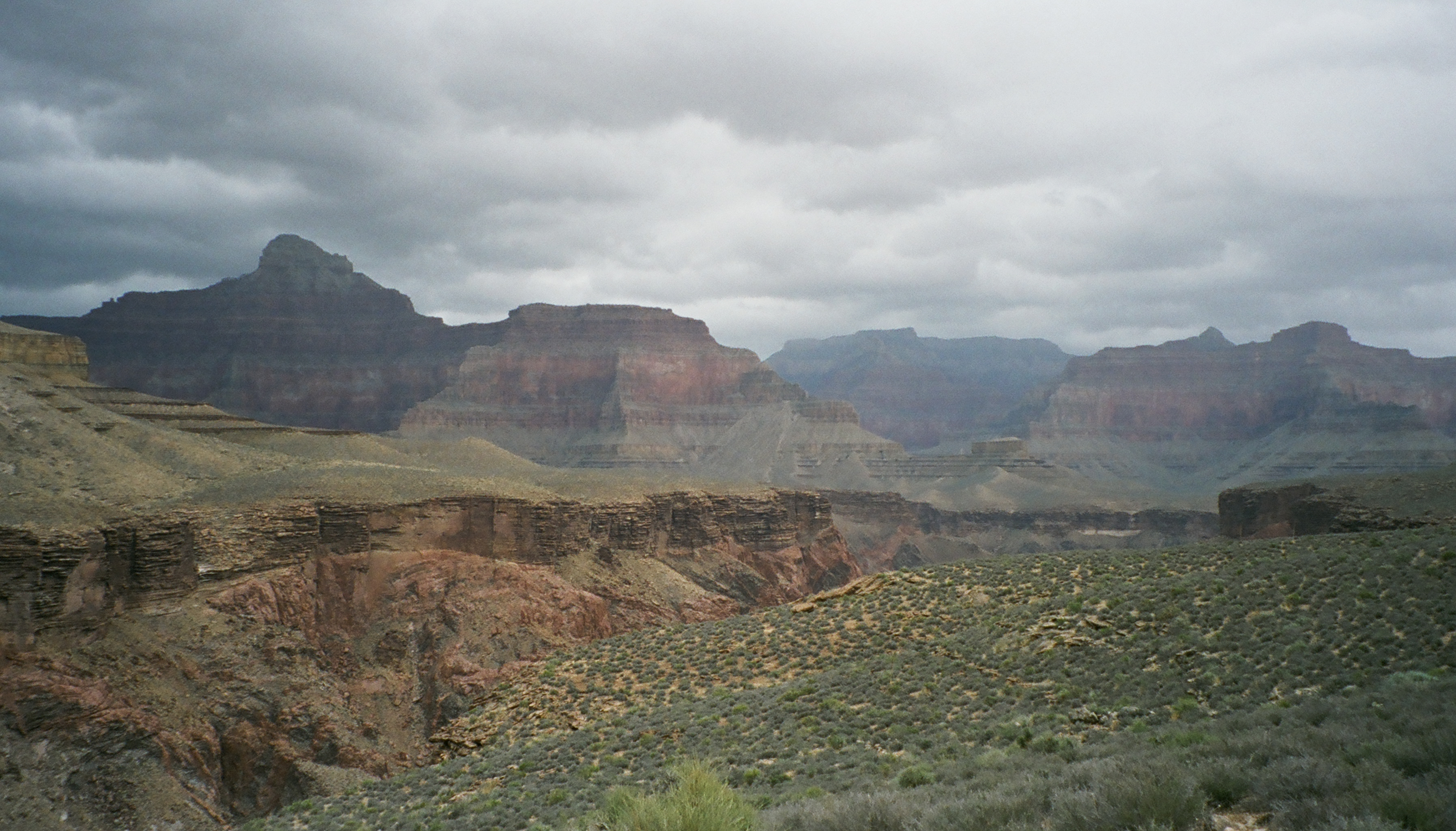
A view of the Tonto Trail between the South Bass Trail and Hermit Trail in the Grand Canyon.

Tonto crosses the South Bass Trail, Boucher Trail, Hermit Trail, Monument Trail, Bright Angel Trail, South Kaibab Trail and ends at the New Hance Trail. The Grandview Trail is also accessible via its eastern and western spurs. All of the connecting trails provide access to and from the Grand Canyon south rim, while the Bright Angel Trail and South Kaibab Trail both provide access to the Colorado River, and the north rim via the North Kaibab Trail.

At Garnet Canyon, the Tonto Trail officially ends, but a trail continues along the Colorado River to Elves Chasm. There is also a junction with the Royal Arch Route, which requires a short rappel to access the river trail. At Red Canyon, the eastern end of the Tonto Trail, the Escalante Route continues eastward, connecting to the Tanner Trail and Beamer Trail at Tanner Rapids.

There is additional access to the Colorado River in Monument Canyon, Hermit Creek Canyon and Boucher Creek Canyon via approximately 1½ mile spur trails that lead to designated campsites at the river.

=== Condition ===
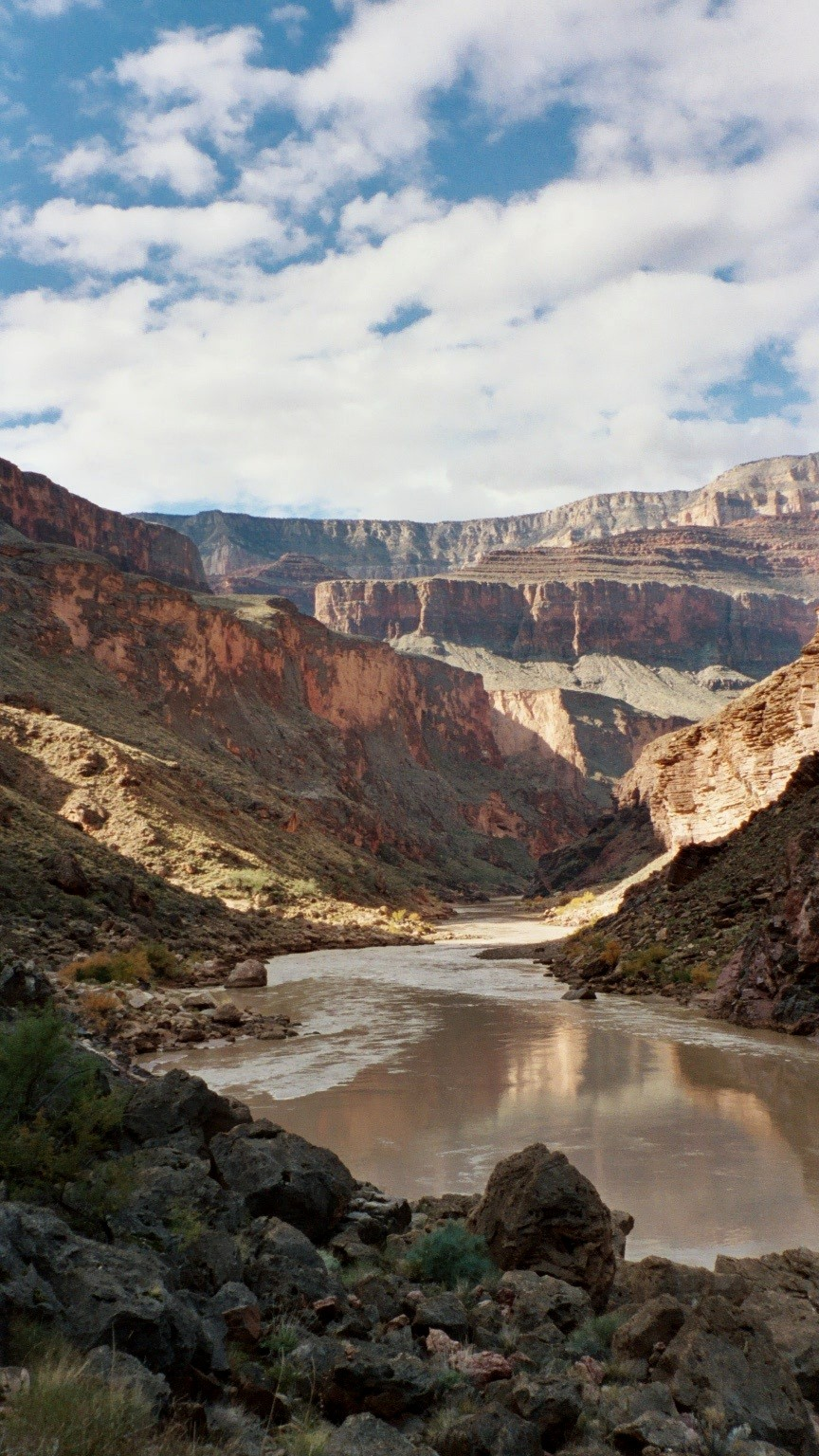
The start of the west Tonto Trail.

Trail conditions vary based on the amount of traffic certain sections receive. The section between the Bright Angel Trail and the South Kaibab Trail (4.6 miles, 7.4 kilometres) is the most heavily travelled and the easiest to follow. Less traveled sections are subject to overgrowth by canyon flora early in the spring season, and may require route finding skills to traverse.

=== Water availability ===
All water sources along this trail must be treated, filtered, or boiled before drinking, with the exception of water available at the junction with the Bright Angel Trail (at Havasupai Gardens).

Hermit Creek, Monument Creek, and Garden Creek flow year round and can be consumed after purification. Water from Horn Creek should be avoided except in emergency circumstances due to radioactive contamination from the Lost Orphan Uranium Mine (defunct) below Powell Point.

The park's Backcountry Information Center has current water conditions for all water sources along the Tonto Trail.

=== Camping ===
Camping is allowed along the Tonto Trail by permit only, issued by the Grand Canyon National Park Backcountry Information Center. Use of these areas overnight are regulated by the National Park Service, and they call for a maximum number of groups (7 to 11 people) and parties (1 to 6 people), as well as a maximum total number of persons. The Tonto Trail passes through numerous backcountry use areas. The three letter code indicates the park's use area designation (listed from east to west):

Use areas along Tonto Trail from east to west
Area	Name	Type	Group(s)		Parties	Max People
BD9	Red Canyon	At-large	1	and	2	23
BE9	Hance Creek	At-large	1	and	2	23
BG9	Cottonwood Creek	At-large	1	and	2	23
BH9	Grapevine	At-large	1	and	2	23
BJ9	Cremation	At-large	1	and	2	23
CIG	Indian Garden	Campground	1	and	15	50
BL4	Horn Creek	Campsite	0		1	6
BL5	Salt Creek	Campsite	0		1	6
BL6	Cedar Spring	Campsite	0		1	6
BL7	Monument Creek	Campsite	1	and	2	23
BL8	Granite Rapids	Campsite	1	and	2	23
BM7	Hermit Creek	Campsite	1	and	3	29
BM8	Hermit Rapids	Campsite	1	and	1	17
BN9	Boucher	At-large	1	and	2	23
BO9	Slate	At-large	1	and	2	23
BP9	Ruby	At-large	1	and	2	23
BQ9	South Bass	At-large	1	and	2	23
BR9	Garnet	At-large	1	and	2	23

Use permits are available on a first-come, first-served basis from the park's Backcountry Information Center. Requests are taken beginning on the 1st day of the month, up to four months before the requested first night of camping.

=== Hazards ===
Hazards hikers can encounter along the Tonto Trail include dehydration, sudden rainstorms, flash flooding, loose footing, rockfall, encounters with wildlife, and extreme heat. At the Colorado River, additional hazards include hypothermia (due to the river's consistently cold temperatures), trauma (due to collisions with boulders in rapids), and drowning.

Hikers who venture east of the South Kaibab Trail or west of the Hermit Trail are more likely to find solitude and isolation in addition to other hazards related to desert hiking.

== See also ==
- List of trails in Grand Canyon National Park
