= South Bass Trail =

Grand Canyon hiking trail

Coordinates: 36.1839°N 112.37567°W

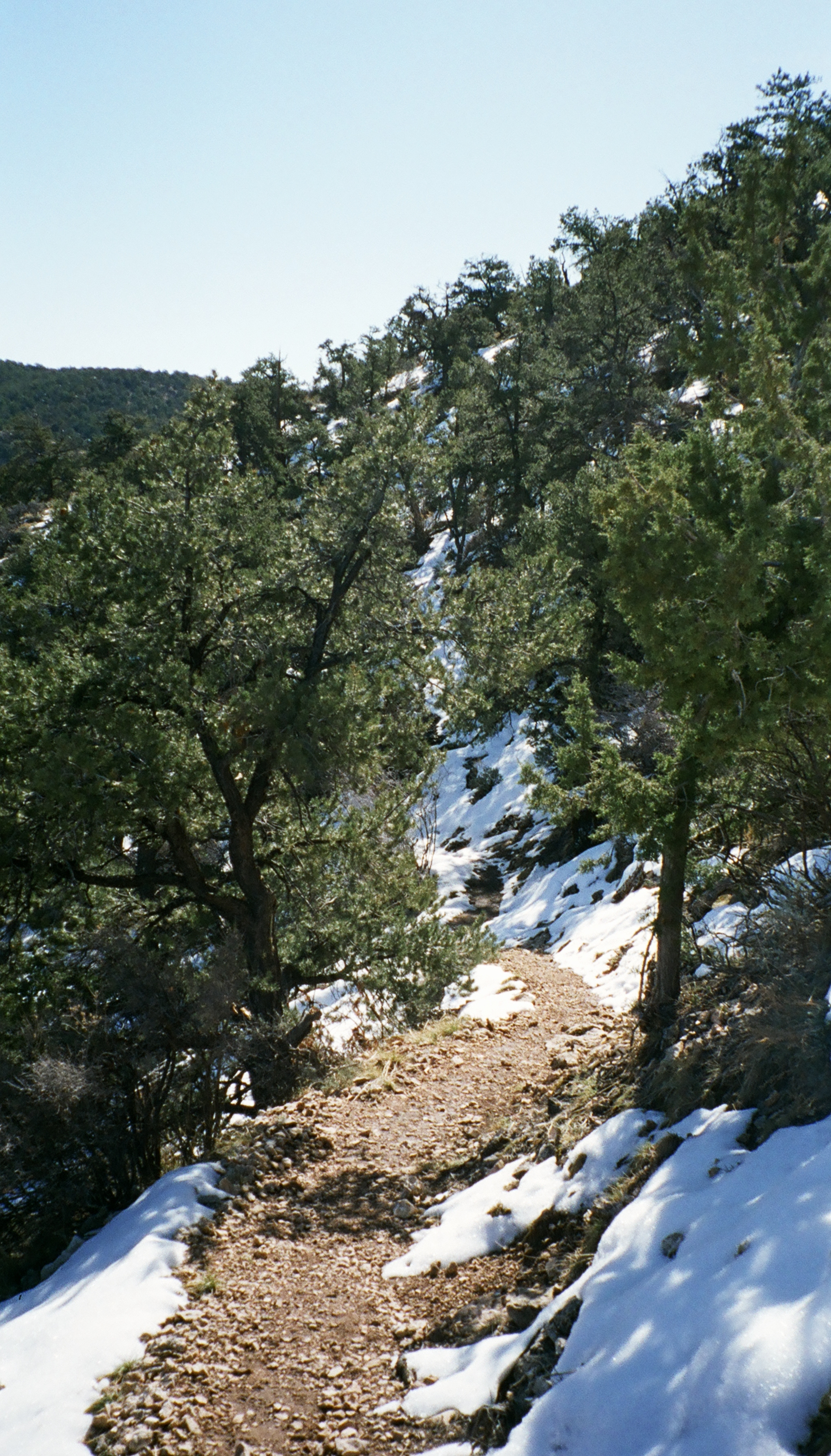
- The beginning of the South Bass Trail
- Location: Grand Canyon National Park, Arizona, United States
- Trailheads: Colorado River
- Use: Hiking
- Sights: Grand Canyon
- Hazards: Severe Weather; Overexertion; Dehydration; Flash Flood

The South Bass Trail is a hiking trail located on the South Rim of the Grand Canyon National Park, located in the U.S. state of Arizona.

== Access ==
The trail is accessible by use of U.S. Forest Service roads along the south rim of Grand Canyon. The trailhead is located in a remote area of the park's south rim and is accessible from Rowe Well Road or Forest Service Road #328. It generally takes 1½ to 2 hours to negotiate the 29 mile (47 km) trip from Grand Canyon Village, Arizona. The road passes through the Havasupai Indian Reservation, whose government may collect tolls to pass through. Directions are available from the park's Backcountry Information Center. The trail begins at 6,646 feet (2,026 m) elevation. It ends at Pasture Wash Road, Forest Service Road #2515.

== Description ==
The Tonto Trail crosses the South Bass Trail a mile from the Colorado River. From this junction, to the west is Elves Chasm and the terminus of the Royal Arch Route, and to the east is the Boucher Trail and Hermit Trail, which provide access to the south rim via Hermit's Rest.

The trail itself is considered difficult. No services are available, and the only reliable water is at the Colorado River, which must be treated before consuming.

== History ==
At one time, this trail was connected to the North Bass Trail via a cable and platform that crossed the Colorado River. The tramway no longer exists, and river crossing can only be made by raft.

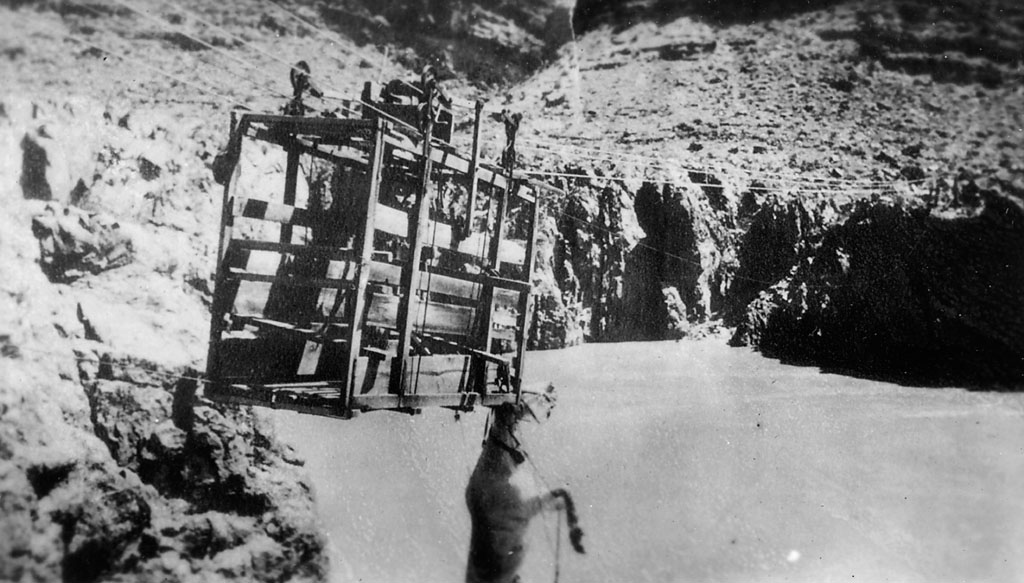
Historic ferry at the Colorado River, Bass Trail

== See also ==
- The Grand Canyon
- List of trails in Grand Canyon National Park
