= Thunder River =

Thunder River may refer to:

- Thunder River (Peshtigo River tributary), a tributary in Wisconsin, US
- Thunder River (Tapeats Creek tributary), a tributary in the Grand Canyon, Arizona
- Thunder River Rapids Ride, an amusement ride at Dreamworld
- Thunder River (ride), amusement rides at Six Flags Astroworld, Six Flags Over Georgia, and Six Flags St. Louis
- Thunder River Trail, a hiking trail in Arizona, US
