= Royal Arch =

Royal Arch may refer to:

- Royal Arch, Dundee, erected in Dundee to commemorate a visit to the city by Queen Victoria and Prince Albert in 1844
- A vault said to have been built underneath Solomon's Temple
- Royal Arch Route, a hiking trail to the Royal Arch natural bridge in Grand Canyon National Park
- Royal Arches, granite arches in Yosemite National Park
- Royal Arch Purple, an organisation related to the Orange Order
- In Freemasonry:
  - The Holy Royal Arch, an appendant Masonic degree conferred in Great Britain, and much of Europe and the Commonwealth
  - Royal Arch Masonry, the equivalent Royal Arch body as practiced as a part of the York Rite
