= Boucher Trail =

Grand Canyon hiking trail

Coordinates: 36.06013°N 112.23571°W

- Travertine Canyon and Whites Butte
- Length: 9 mi (14 km)
- Location: Grand Canyon National Park, Arizona, United States
- Trailheads: Dripping Springs Trail; Colorado River
- Use: Hiking
- Elevation change: 2,900 ft (880 m)
- Highest point: Yuma Point, 5,240 ft (1,600 m)
- Lowest point: Colorado River, 2,340 ft (710 m)
- Difficulty: Very Strenuous
- Season: Spring through Fall
- Sights: Grand Canyon; Colorado River
- Hazards: Severe Weather; Overexertion; Dehydration; Flash Flood

The Boucher Trail is a hiking trail of the South Rim in Grand Canyon National Park, located in the U.S. state of Arizona.

== Access and description ==
The trail officially begins at a low point on the Dripping Springs Trail, in the southwest part of Hermit Canyon. Access to the Boucher Trail requires a hike of about 2 3/4 miles (4.4 km) along the Hermit Trail and Dripping Springs Trail. Cairns exist in key places and can be spotted with some careful looking.

The trail heads to the north and has little elevation change after leaving the Hermit Trail. There are a few short, sharp descents and climbs around minor rockfalls and washbeds. After about 3 miles (4.8 km) the trail contours around Yuma Point and heads southwestward until a sharp descent at the head of Travertine Canyon through the Supai Group. This descent steepens above 25% at places, which requires care to descend. Hikers descending in this area may need to exercise care as some points require steps down of three to five feet (0.91 to 1.52 m). After the descent, the trail heads up for a short stretch on the east side of Travertine Canyon, then immediately crosses over to a long stretch on the west side of Travertine Canyon to the Whites Butte saddle between Travertine and Boucher Canyons.

Boucher Creek

After the Whites Butte saddle, the trail descends through a natural break in the Redwall Limestone onto the Tonto Platform to a junction with the Tonto Trail. This section is not as steep as the Travertine Canyon section, but can still exceed a 20% grade. The junction is marked by a noticeable cairn. At the junction, the Tonto Trail heads east towards Hermit Canyon or west into the Boucher Creek drainage.

To the west, the Boucher Trail and Tonto Trail descend through the Tapeats Sandstone for 3/4 mi (1.2 km) to Boucher Creek. At the confluence of Boucher Creek and Topaz Creek, the Tonto Trail splits off and continues northwest, while the Boucher Trail follows the creek northeast as it continues to flow to the Colorado River, which marks the end of the trail. Boucher Creek's flow disappears and reappears numerous times on this section of the trail.

Mileages and features along the Boucher Trail Add mileage hiked on other trails.
Distance (mi)	Elv (ft)	Location	Connecting trails	Toilet	Water
0	5140	Trailhead	Dripping Springs Trail		
2	5240	Yuma Point			
4.5	4900	Whites Butte Saddle			
6	3100	Trail Junction	Tonto Trail east		
6.7	2770	Boucher Creek			Boucher Creek, Perennial
6.9	2700	Trail Junction	Tonto Trail west		Boucher Creek, Perennial
8.1	2320	Boucher Rapids, Colorado River			Boucher Creek, Colorado River

=== Condition ===
Grand Canyon National Park categorizes the Boucher Trail as a "primitive trail". With this designation it receives only low-key maintenance as conditions warrant, or to prevent resource damage. There are few patrols by park rangers along primitive trails, depending on daily usage.

The Boucher Trail is less travelled than the Hermit Trail on the other side of Hermit Canyon and is not as well defined. Because of this, the trail can be hard to pick out in places and is overgrown in a few places by canyon flora. The section descending the Supai Group in Travertine Canyon is marked by rockfalls and is exceedingly steep, requiring care when descending.

=== Water availability ===
The only water sources along the trail are in the last mile at Boucher Creek and at the Colorado River. An additional water source can be found at Dripping Springs, on the Dripping Springs Trail about a mile northwest of its junction with the Boucher Trail. All natural water sources need to be treated, filtered, or boiled prior to consumption.

=== Camping ===
Camping is allowed at-large along the Boucher Trail, except within ¼ mile of the junction with the Dripping Springs Trail. The park requires selecting campsites that have been previously used. Due to the proximity to water, there are many suitable camping locations around Boucher Creek.

Use areas along Tonto Trail from east to west
Area	Name	Type	Group(s)		Parties	Max People
BN9	Boucher	At-large	1	and	2	23

=== Hazards ===
Hazards hikers can encounter along the Boucher Trail include dehydration due to difficulty accessing potable water and unsafe trail conditions, especially following snowfall.

Hikers are more likely to find solitude and isolation in addition to other hazards related to desert hiking.

== History ==
The trail is named for Grand Canyon prospector and guide Louis Boucher, who lived in a cabin he built alongside Boucher Creek while mining in the area. He lived alone while in the canyon, making supply runs to the south rim from time to time. Because of his solitude, he was often labeled as a hermit, and is often credited as being the hermit referenced by canyon features of the same name, including the Hermit Trail.

== See also ==
- List of trails in Grand Canyon National Park
