= List of trails in Grand Canyon National Park =

The following is a list of hiking trails that are, in whole or part, within the established boundaries of Grand Canyon National Park, located in Coconino and Mohave counties in the U.S. state of Arizona.

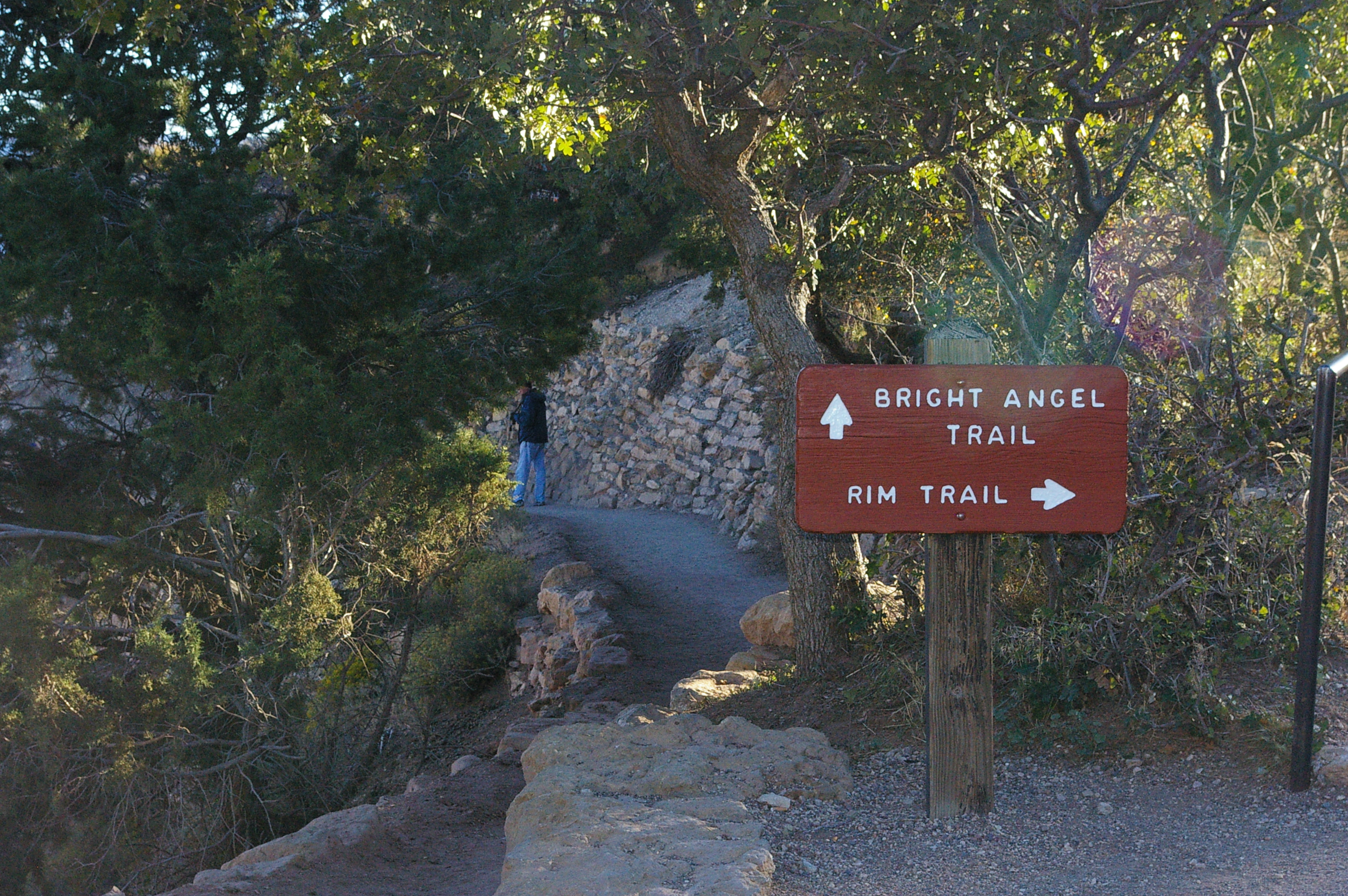
Bright Angel Trail head on the south rim.

== Management ==
All pack and foot trails in Grand Canyon National Park fall under the jurisdiction of the Grand Canyon Backcountry Office (BCO), located in the Backcountry Information Center in Grand Canyon Village. This building previously housed a railway depot. The BCO administers trail maintenance, patrol, and search and rescue operations in the Grand Canyon's backcountry areas.

The Grand Canyon Backcountry Office manages undeveloped areas of the canyon by following the 1988 Backcountry Management Plan (BMP), as amended. The goal of the plan is to mitigate human impacts to ecologically sensitive areas within the park. In those areas, the BMP provides management guidelines for:

- Establishment of management zones (use areas)
- Permit system and fee structure for overnight use
- Establishment of visitor use limits
- Enforcement of the plan's provisions
- Interpretive programs to educate canyon visitors
- Research to determine if the plan's goals are being met

The adoption of the BMP marked the first time permits were required for overnight use of the park's backcountry. The permit process was instituted on 1 October 1988 and is still in use today. Permits may be applied for up to four months in advance of a hiker's planned itinerary, on the first day of each month. Permit requests may be faxed, mailed, or delivered in-person. A permit is not required for day use of backcountry trails.

Fees are required to obtain backcountry-use permits. Information can be obtained from the parks Backcountry Information Center.

The Park Service asks that travelers abide by Leave No Trace principles.

== Backcountry trail designations ==
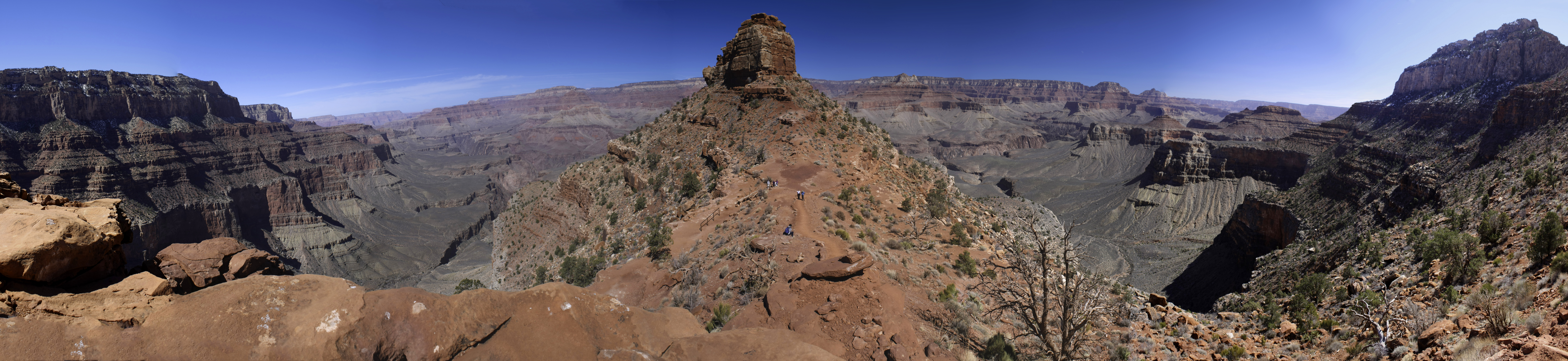
A panoramic view as seen from the South Kaibab Trail

Established trails within backcountry areas of the park are assigned one of the following designations by the National Park Service:

- Corridor Trails: recommended for beginners
- Threshold Trails: recommended for experienced hikers
- Primitive Trails: recommended for highly experienced hikers
- Routes/Wild: recommended only for experts familiar with route finding in the Grand Canyon

These designations define the expected daily use of a trail, as well as its level of management, maintenance, and patrol by park personnel or backcountry rangers.

=== Corridor trails ===
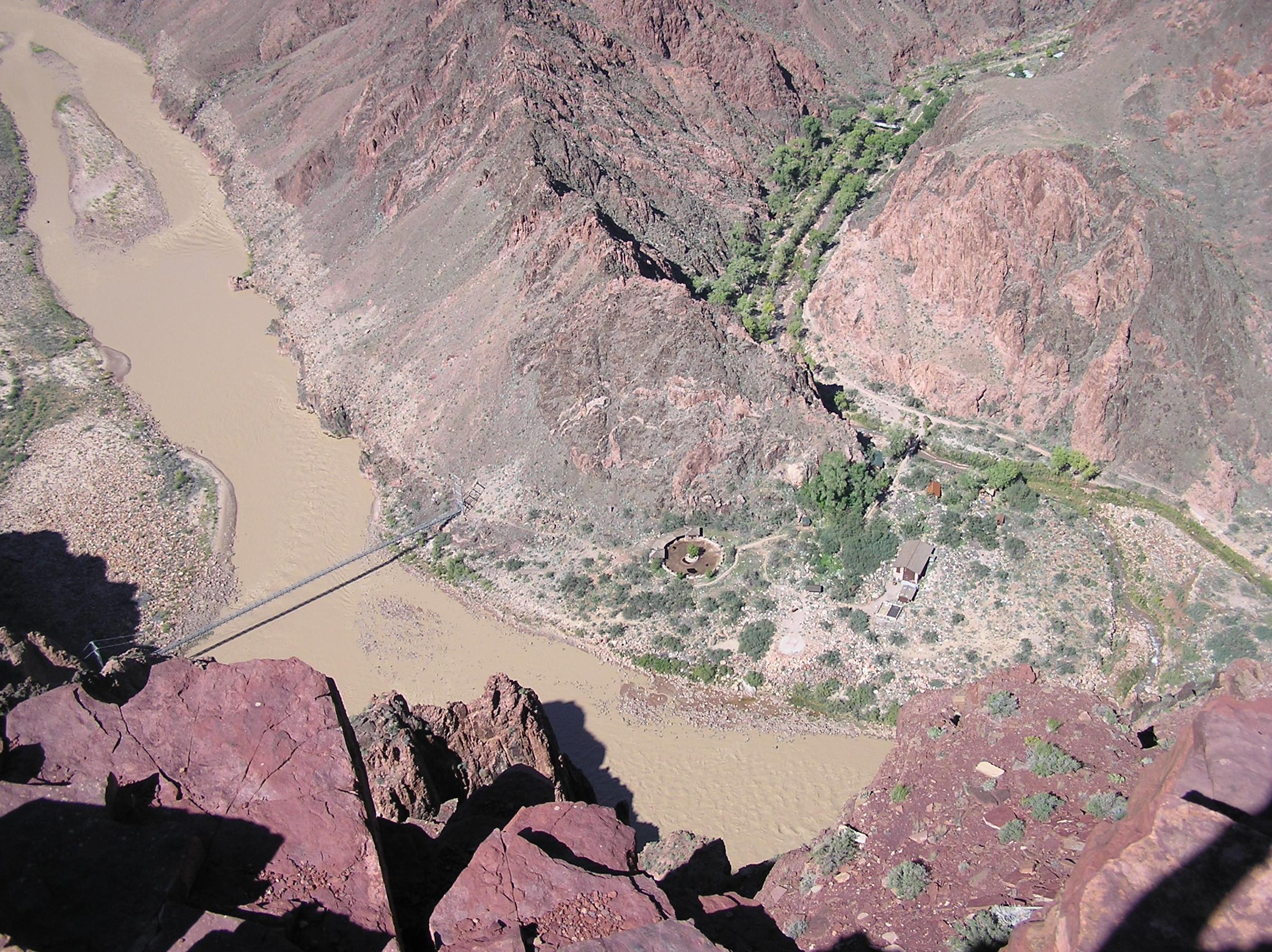
View of Phantom Ranch from the South Kaibab Trail

A corridor trail receives the highest hiking and stock use by visitors to the park and mule use by park concessionaires. To accommodate this, the National Park Service regularly patrols and maintains corridor trails. Backcountry rangers recommend that hikers taking their first trip into the inner canyon use one of the park's corridor trails. These areas include three campgrounds: Havasupai Gardens, Bright Angel, and Cottonwood, each of which have ranger stations, water, and emergency phones.

The following are designated as corridor trails:

- Bright Angel Trail
- North Kaibab Trail
- Plateau Point Trail
- River Trail
- South Kaibab Trail

The South Kaibab Trail and North Kaibab Trail are officially part of the Arizona Trail system which crosses the park from south to north, although they retain their original names in all park publications and signage.

=== Threshold trails ===
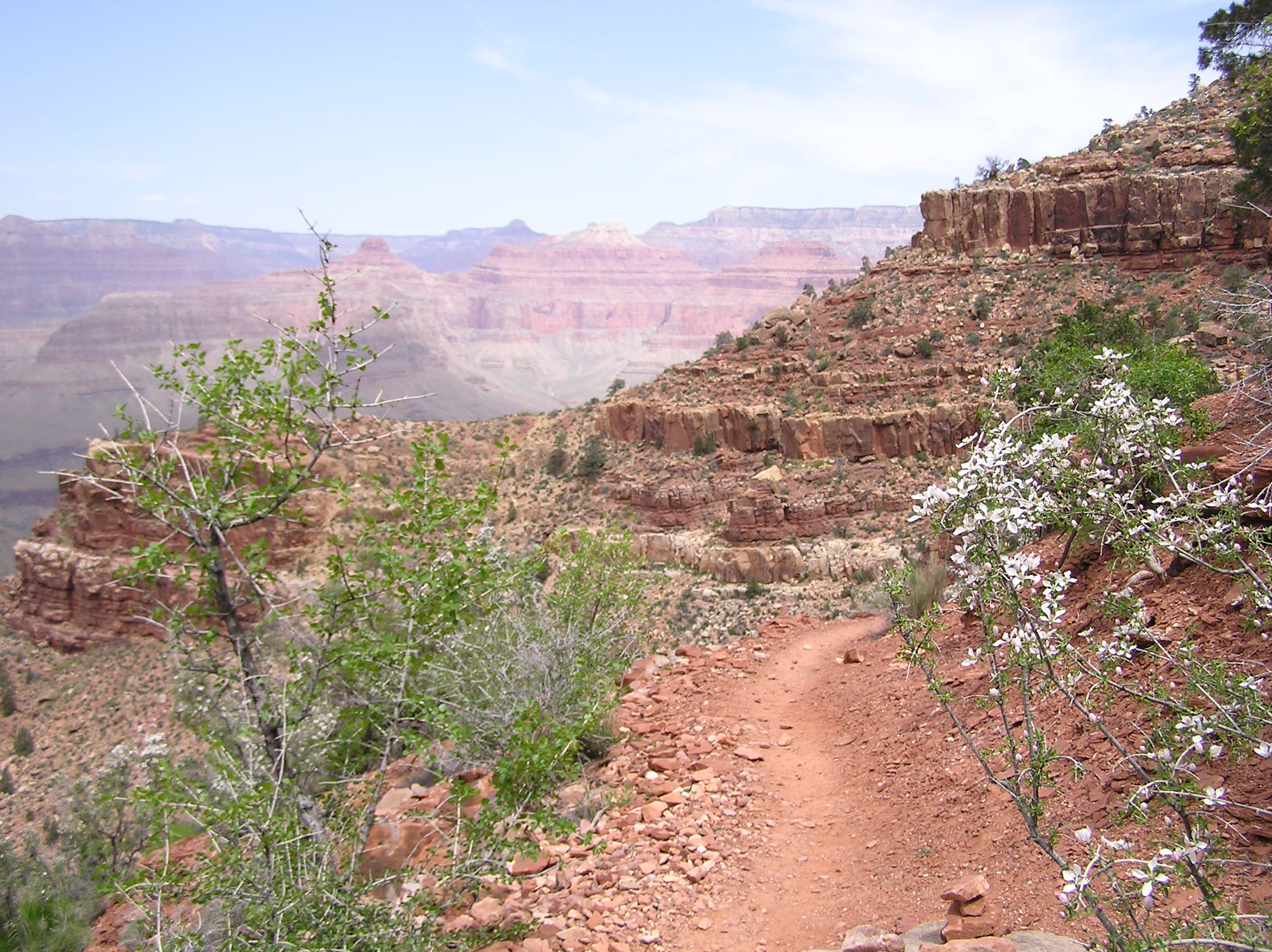
The Hermit Trail

A threshold trail receives lower visitation than corridor trails, but will receive more than primitive trails. The National Park Service does not regularly maintain threshold trails, but reconstructs sections damaged by environmental forces, or to prevent further trail erosion. Maintenance will also be done to protect historical features along a threshold trail. Cairns are permitted, but are to be placed discriminately.

The following are designated as threshold trails:

- Clear Creek Trail
- Dripping Springs Trail
- Grandview Trail
- Hermit Trail
- Thunder River Trail
- Waldron Trail

=== Primitive trails ===
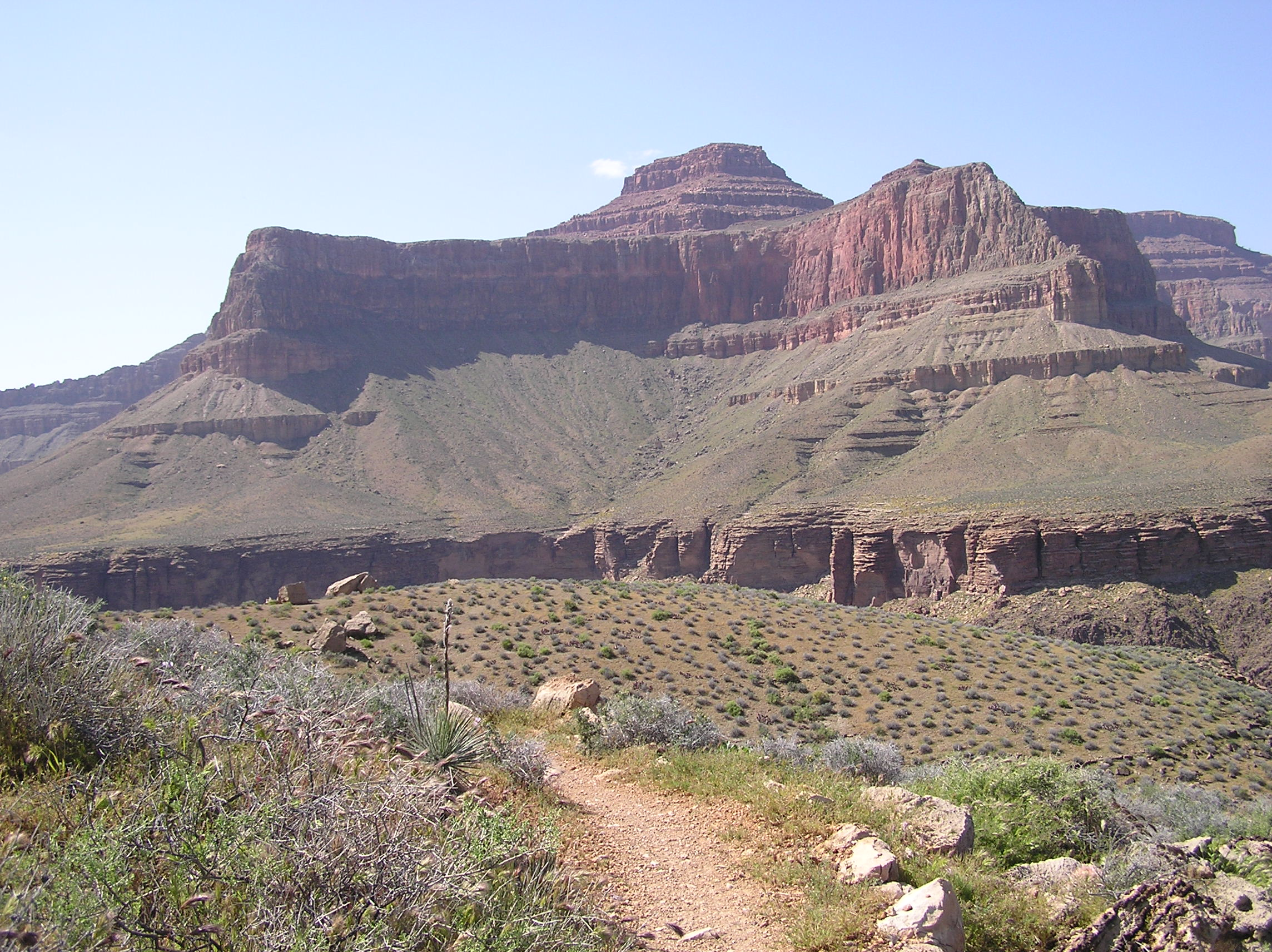
Tonto Trail and Tower of Set

A primitive trail receives the least visitation of all trails. The National Park Service does not regularly maintain primitive trails, but reconstructs sections damaged by environmental forces only in cases where its existing condition creates a hazard. Multiple trail eradication is done to prevent accidental off-trail hiking. Cairns are permitted, but are to be placed discriminately.

The following are designated as primitive trails:

- Beamer Trail
- Bill Hall Trail
- Boucher Trail
- Deer Creek Trail
- Havasu Canyon Route (a portion of this trail is within the park).
- Kanab Creek Trail
- Lava Falls Trail
- Nankoweap Trail
- North Bass Trail
- New Hance Trail (a.k.a. Red Canyon Trail)
- South Bass Trail
- South Canyon Trail
- Tanner Trail
- Tonto Trail
- Tuckup Trail

=== Routes ===
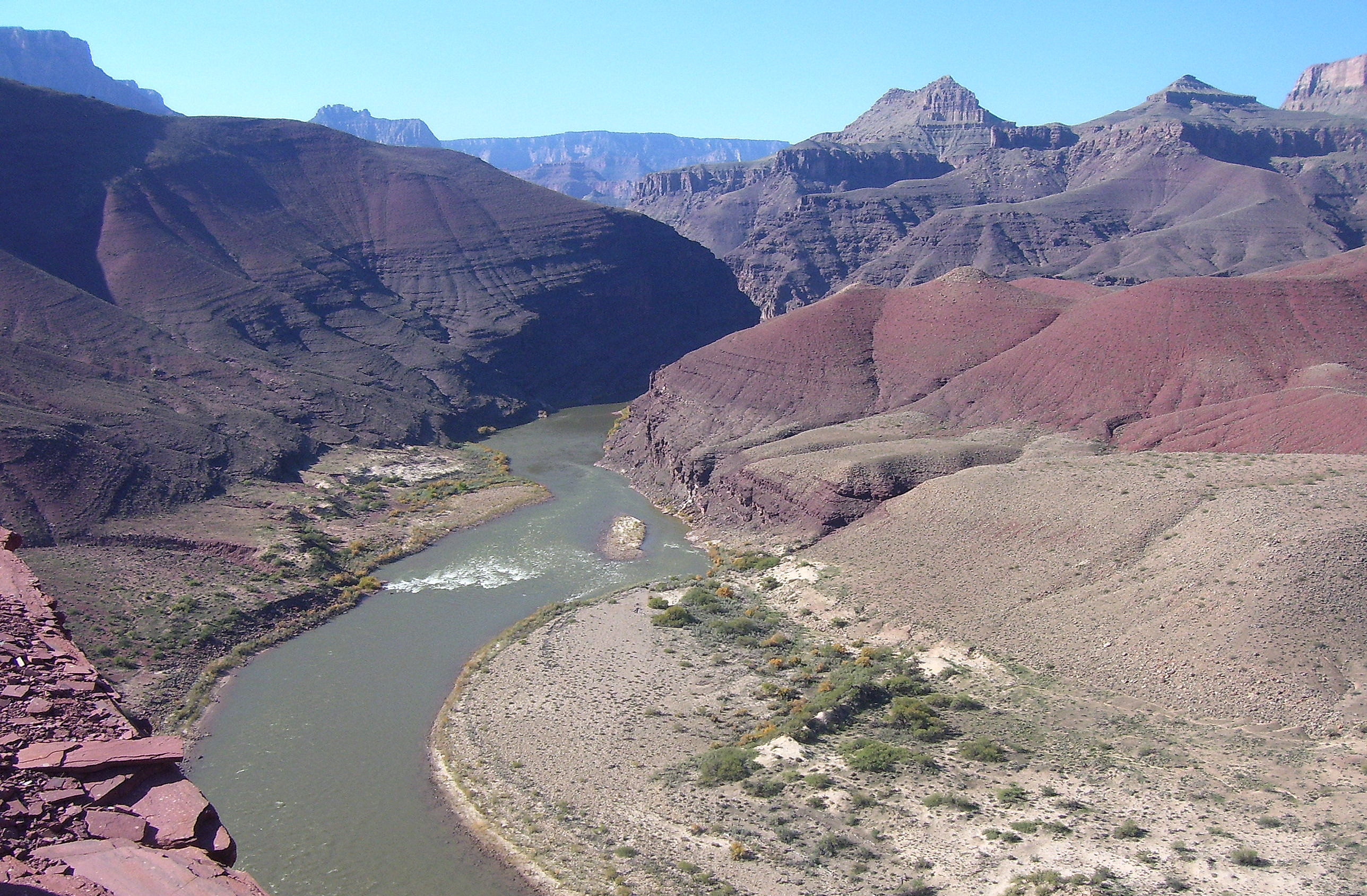
View of the Colorado River along the Escalante Route

A route is a footpath that does not fall under the definition of trail because it was not deliberately constructed, or contains portions of trails that have fallen into such disrepair that they can no longer be identified on a map. Routes may exist due to cross-country hiking or animal use.

Due to their difficulty, routes receive the lowest visitation of all footpaths within the park. The National Park Service only maintains routes to minimize damage to nearby natural resources.

The following do not fall into any of the above trail designations, and are classified as routes:

- Escalante Route
- Esplanade Route
- Royal Arch Route

== Above-rim trails ==
The following hiking trails exist within Grand Canyon National Park but do not venture below the rim of the canyon.

- Bright Angel Point Trail
- Cape Final Trail
- Cape Royal Trail
- Cliff Spring Trail
- Fire Point Trail
- Francois Matthes Trail (named after François E. Matthes)
- Ken Patrick Trail
- Komo Point Trail
- Rim Trail
- Tiyo Point Trail
- Transept Trail
- Uncle Jim Trail
- Walhalla Glades Trail
- Walhalla Spur Trail
- Widforss Trail

== See also ==
- Grand Canyon
- Grand Canyon National Park
- List of Colorado River rapids and features
