= Cape Final Trail =

Grand Canyon hiking trail

Coordinates: 36.14576°N 111.9348°W

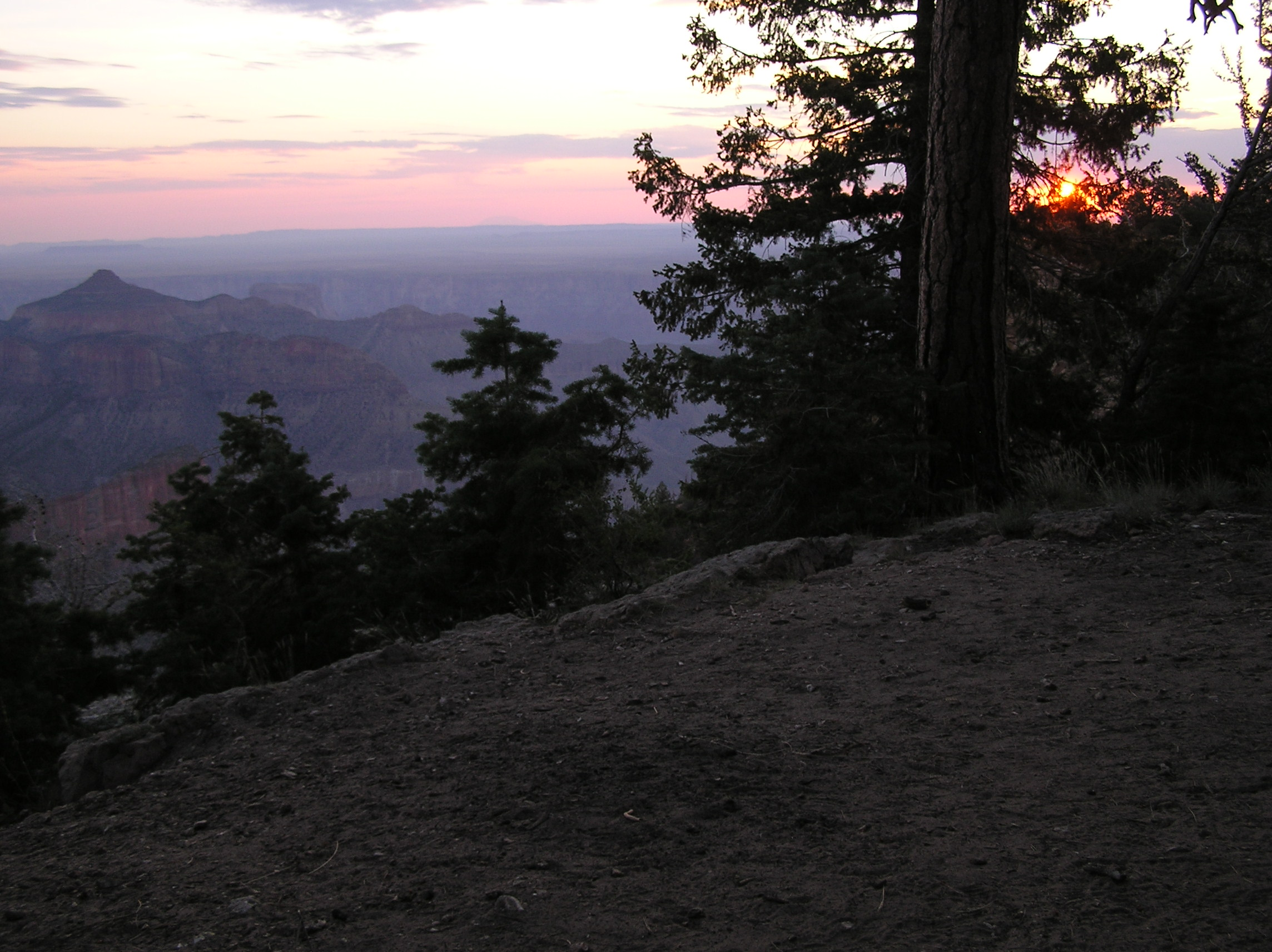
- Sunrise off Cape Final Trail
- Length: 2 mi (3.2 km)
- Location: Grand Canyon National Park, Arizona, United States
- Trailheads: Cape Royal Road; Cape Final (Point)
- Use: Hiking
- Elevation change: 210 ft (64 m)
- Highest point: 0.5 mi (0.80 km) from Cape Royal Road, 8,050 ft (2,450 m)
- Lowest point: Trailhead, 7,840 ft (2,390 m)
- Difficulty: Moderate, due to Altitude
- Season: Early Spring through Late Fall
- Sights: Grand Canyon
- Hazards: Severe Weather; Lightning

The Cape Final Trail is a hiking trail on the North Rim of the Grand Canyon National Park, located in the U.S. state of Arizona.

== Description ==
It is located on the Walhalla Plateau at the Grand Canyon's North Rim. Access is from the Cape Royal Road, about 2.5 miles (4.0 km) north of Cape Royal. Access to this part of the park by car is seasonal, traditionally open from mid-May to mid-October or depending on snowcover from the previous winter.

The trail is only 2 miles (3.2 km) long one-way and terminates at Cape Final at an elevation of 7,916 feet (2,413 m) overlooking the eastern Grand Canyon from Nankoweap to the Unkar Creek Delta.

No water is available (even at the trailhead), except early in the season by melting snow. Otherwise all water needed must be carried for the duration of the hike.

=== Camping ===
The Grand Canyon Backcountry Use Plan designates the area along this trail (use area NA1) for At-Large Camping, with a valid permit. One can be obtained from the Backcountry Information Center, located just north of the North Rim Campground along State Route 67. There are good campsites along the last half mile of this trail. The nearest toilet facilities are available at Cape Royal 2.5 miles (4.0 km) south of the trailhead at the end of Cape Royal Rd.

== See also ==
- The Grand Canyon
- List of trails in Grand Canyon National Park
- Greenland Lake
