= Walhalla Glades Trail =

Grand Canyon hiking trail

- Location: 36.2231°N 111.9657°W Grand Canyon National Park, Arizona, United States
- Use: Hiking
- Sights: Grand Canyon
- Hazards: Severe Weather; Overexertion; Dehydration; Flash Flood

The Walhalla Glades Trail is a hiking trail located on the North Rim of the Grand Canyon in Grand Canyon National Park in the U.S. state of Arizona.

The Walhalla Glades area contains Ancestral Puebloan (Anasazi) affiliated archaeological sites dating from between A.D. 1050 to A.D. 1150.

== See also ==
- List of trails in Grand Canyon National Park
