= Dripping Springs Trail =

Grand Canyon hiking trail

Coordinates: 36.05558°N 112.22357°W

- Hermit Canyon
- Length: 2 mi (3.2 km)
- Location: Grand Canyon National Park, Arizona, United States
- Trailheads: Hermit Trail; Eremita Mesa, South Rim
- Use: Hiking
- Elevation change: 1,180 ft (360 m)
- Highest point: Eremita Mesa, 6,420 ft (1,960 m)
- Lowest point: Hermit Trail, 5,240 ft (1,600 m)
- Difficulty: Moderate to Strenuous
- Season: Spring through Fall
- Sights: Grand Canyon
- Hazards: Severe Weather; Overexertion; Dehydration; Flash Flood

The Dripping Springs Trail is a hiking trail on the South Rim of the Grand Canyon National Park, located in the U.S. state of Arizona.

== Access and description ==
The trail begins along the Hermit Trail after a 1 1/2 miles (2.4 km) hike from Hermit's Rest.

From Hermit Trail, the trail leaves the Hermit Basin and crosses to the western side of Hermit Canyon towards Dripping Springs. After another 1 1/4 miles (2.0 km) the trail crosses the Dripping Springs drainage and connects to the Boucher Trail, which leads to the north along the western side of Hermit Canyon.

The Dripping Springs Trail continues westward from the trail junction for another 1/2 mile (0.80 km), climbing back out of the Hermit Shale and Coconino Sandstone layers to Dripping Springs, a perennial water source. Water from here needs to be treated, filtered, or boiled prior to consuming. After the springs, the trail continues to the south rim on Eremita Mesa and the trail's western terminus. Eremita Mesa is a remote area of the park and provides no access back to Grand Canyon Village or Hermit's Rest except by unmaintained gravel roads.

== See also ==
- The Grand Canyon
- List of trails in Grand Canyon National Park
