= Tapeats Creek =

Creek in Grand Canyon National Park, Arizona, U.S.

- Overhead view of lower section of Tapeats Creek
- Location of the mouth of Tapeats Creek in Arizona
- Native name: Ta Pits (Ute-Southern Paiute)

Location
- Country: United States
- State: Arizona
- County: Coconino

Physical characteristics
- Source: Tapeats Spring
  - location: Grand Canyon (North Rim)
  - coordinates: 36.435°N 112.3443°W
- Mouth: Colorado River
  - location: Grand Canyon (Canyon Floor)
  - coordinates: 36.3705°N 112.4694°W
  - elevation: 1,985 feet (605 m)

Basin features
- Tributaries
  - left: Thunder River

Tapeats Creek is a creek located entirely within the Grand Canyon National Park. It flows southwest from its source near the North Rim of the canyon to the Colorado River at the base of the canyon. It was named by the Second Powell Expedition in the winter of 1871–1872 for a Southern Paiute Indian who claimed ownership of the stream. (Note: The original spelling recorded by the Powell Expedition was "Ta Pits".) It contributes the largest amount of water to the Colorado of any tributary on the north side within the Grand Canyon.

== Sources ==
The creek is fed from Tapeats Spring, the largest Spring in the Grand Canyon. In 1970, the spring was estimated to discharge forty-eight million US gal (180,000,000 L; 40,000,000 imp gal) of water per day into the creek from the Muav Limestone. A small amount of surface water can also flow into the creek. Since the spring flows year round, the creek is a perennial stream.

== Tributaries ==
Tapeats Creek has one named tributary, Thunder River, a 0.5-mile (0.80 km) long river that begins where a natural spring (Thunder Springs) emerges at an elevation of 3,360 feet (1,020 m) and then drops by approximately 1,200 feet (370 m). The river, the steepest and one of the shortest in the United States, ends at the bottom of a waterfall where it joins Tapeats Creek. (Note: The entire system of Thunder River and Tapeats Creek has sometimes been called Thunder River.)

== Environment ==
Common trees along the creek are tamarisk and willows, with equisetum, mimulus, and cress found along the banks. Algae-covered rocks are found in most of the creek. Common aquatic invertebrate found in the creek include mayflies, different types of caddisflies, flies and riffle beetles. Bladder snails, isopods and damselflies can also be found.

== Fishing ==
The creek is considered one of Arizona's best wild-trout streams. The creek can be reached by Thunder River Trail from the North Rim, which is only accessible from mid-May to late October. Alternatively, the creek can be reached by raft trip on the Colorado River. Rainbow trout are plentiful and average 12 inches (300 mm) and can reach 20 inches (510 mm).

== Related ==
The following geologic features are located in the vicinity and are named after the creek:

- the Tapeats Sandstone, which is exposed above the creek
- the Tapeats Rapids in the Colorado, located where the creek enters the river
- Tapeats Amphitheater, a large basin containing the creek's headwaters
- Tapeats Terrace, a terrace with wide low benches
- Tapeats Spring, the natural spring that feeds the creek
