= Nankoweap Trail =

Grand Canyon hiking trail

Coordinates: 36.30°N 111.85°W

- Length: 13.9 mi (22.4 km)
- Location: Grand Canyon National Park, Arizona, United States
- Trailheads: North Rim; Colorado River, Grand Canyon (North Rim)
- Use: Hiking; Backpacking
- Elevation change: 6,040 ft (1,840 m)
- Highest point: North Rim, 8,840 ft (2,690 m)
- Lowest point: Colorado River, 2,800 ft (850 m)
- Difficulty: Expert (unmaintained)
- Season: Early Spring to Late Fall
- Sights: Grand Canyon; Colorado River; Puebloan granaries
- Hazards: Severe Weather; Overexertion; Dehydration; Flash Flood

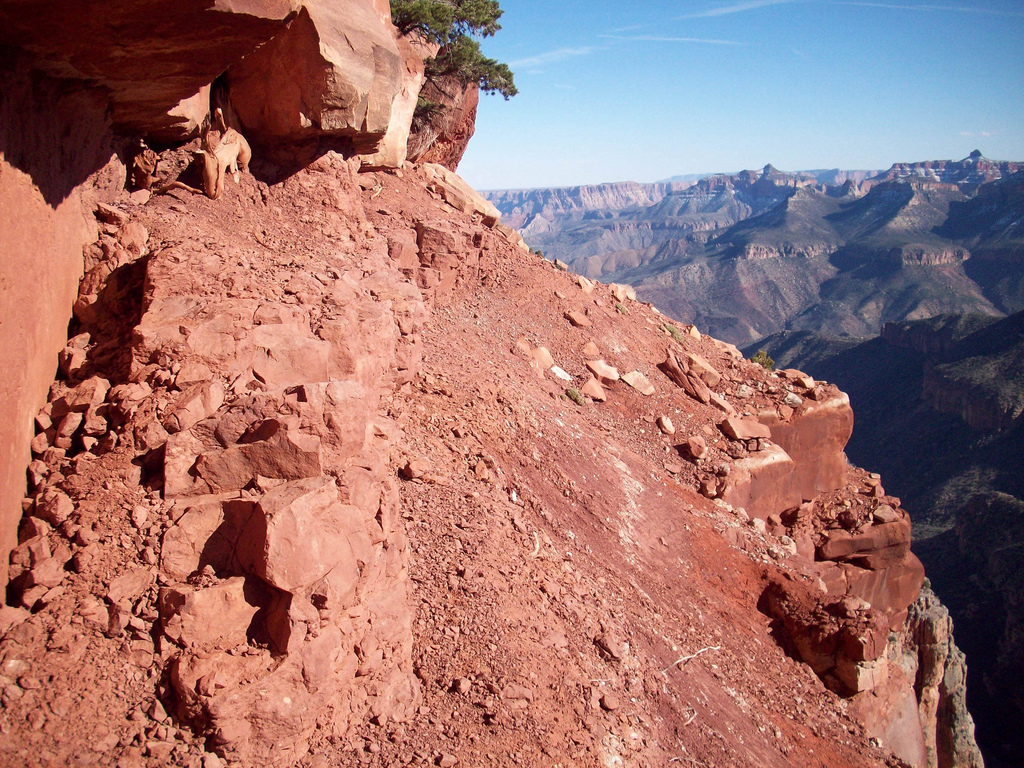
The "scary part" of the Nankoweap Trail

The Nankoweap Trail is an unmaintained hiking trail on the North Rim of the Grand Canyon National Park, located in the U.S. state of Arizona. The Nankoweap trail descends 6,040 feet in 14 miles from the Saddle Mountain trailhead to Nankoweap Creek and on to the Colorado River. It is considered to be the hardest of the trails into the Canyon. Hikers have to carry and cache water as there is none in the 11 miles between the trailhead and Nankoweap Creek.

In June 1996, a Boy Scouts group ran out of water in the vicinity of this trail, although they were not following the actual trail, but an off-trail route on a nearby ridge. Although one member managed to reach the Colorado River, another ultimately died from heat exhaustion and dehydration. This was covered in season 2 of I Shouldn't be Alive.

== See also ==
- List of trails in Grand Canyon National Park
