= Bill Hall Trail =

Grand Canyon hiking trail

Coordinates: 36.43461°N 112.42933°W

Bill Hall trail
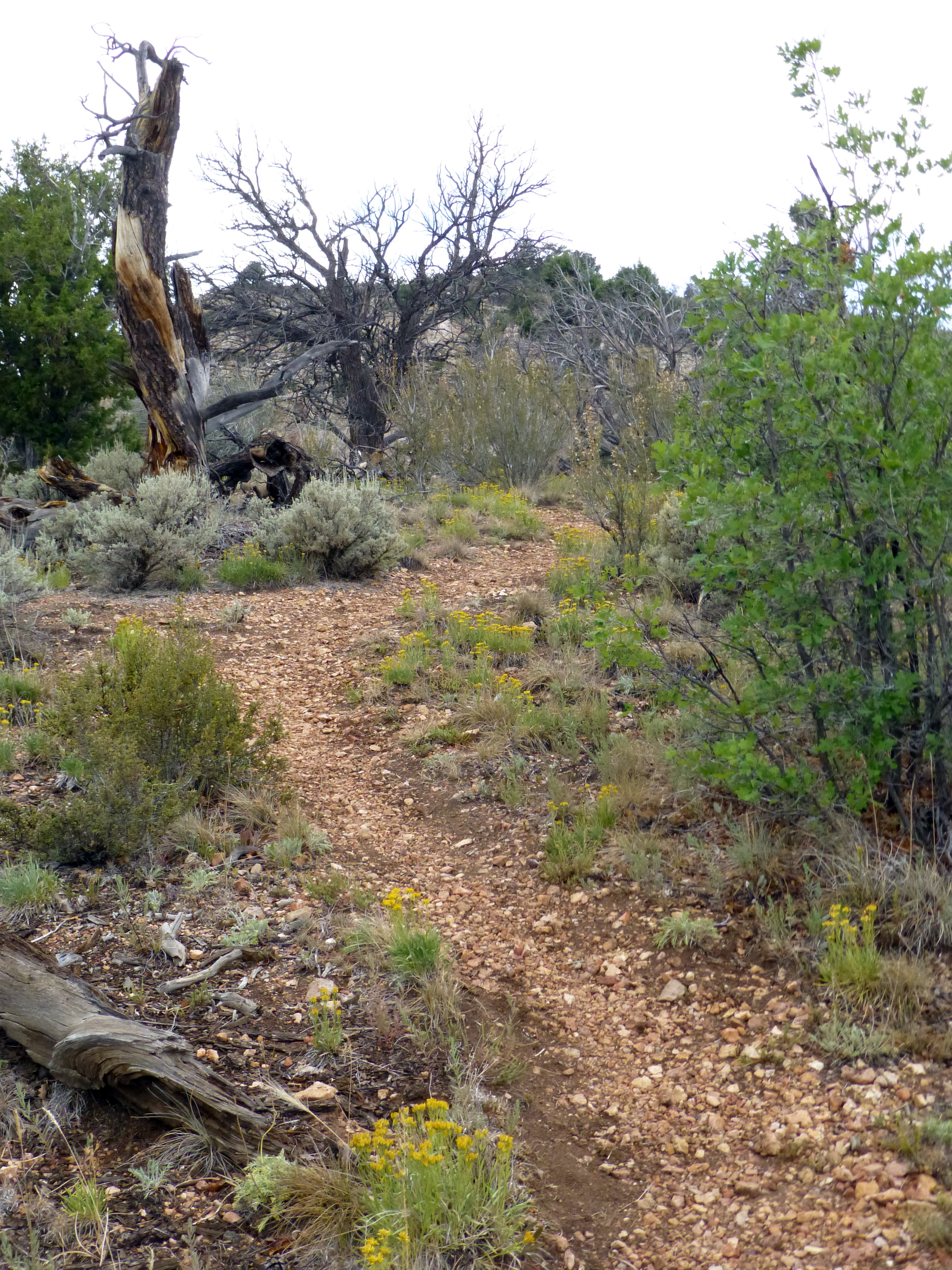
- Location: Grand Canyon National Park, Arizona, United States
- Trailheads: Colorado River
- Use: Hiking
- Sights: Grand Canyon
- Hazards: Severe Weather; Overexertion; Dehydration; Flash Flood

The Bill Hall Trail is a hiking trail in Grand Canyon National Park, located in the U.S. state of Arizona.

== Access ==
The trail begins at Monument Point along the north rim of the canyon on the boundary of the National Park, about 20 miles (32 km) west of the park services at North Rim, Arizona. Access to the trailhead is over 35 miles (56 km) of forest roads made of graded dirt, and a four-wheel drive vehicle is recommended for travel in the area. When roads are dry the trailhead can be accessed by a passenger car.

== Description ==
From the dirt parking lot at the trailhead, the trail heads west and dips below the rim into the park. The trail makes several short, steep switchbacks during its descent through the upper canyon rock layers. In the Coconino Sandstone, the trail is at its steepest. There are numerous boulders, some very large, that require care to detour around or climb over. Some portions of this descent may require lowering of backpacks prior to downclimbing.

After 2 miles (3 km) of steep descent, the trail levels off along the Esplanade Sandstone until the junction with the Thunder River Trail. This junction marks the lower terminus of the trail.

The trail is named for Bill Hall who was a seasonal park ranger on the North Rim who was killed in the line of duty (automobile accident) in 1979.

== See also ==
- The Grand Canyon
- List of trails in Grand Canyon National Park
