= Cape Royal Trail =

Grand Canyon hiking trail

Coordinates: 36.1221°N 111.94885°W

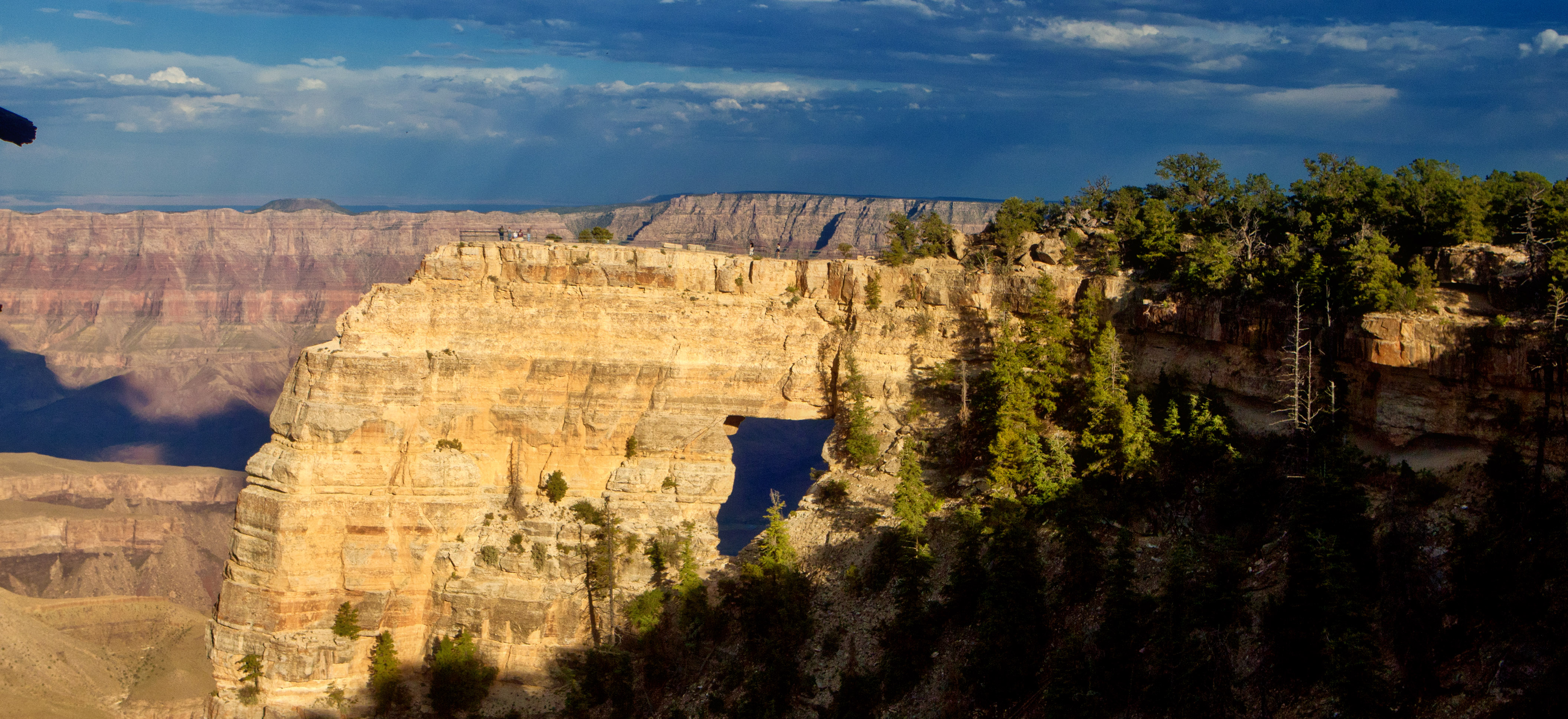
- Angel's Window
- Length: 0.5 mi (0.80 km)
- Location: Grand Canyon National Park, Arizona, United States
- Trailheads: Cape Royal Road
- Use: Hiking
- Difficulty: Easy
- Months: May through October
- Sights: Grand Canyon; Colorado River
- Hazards: Lightning

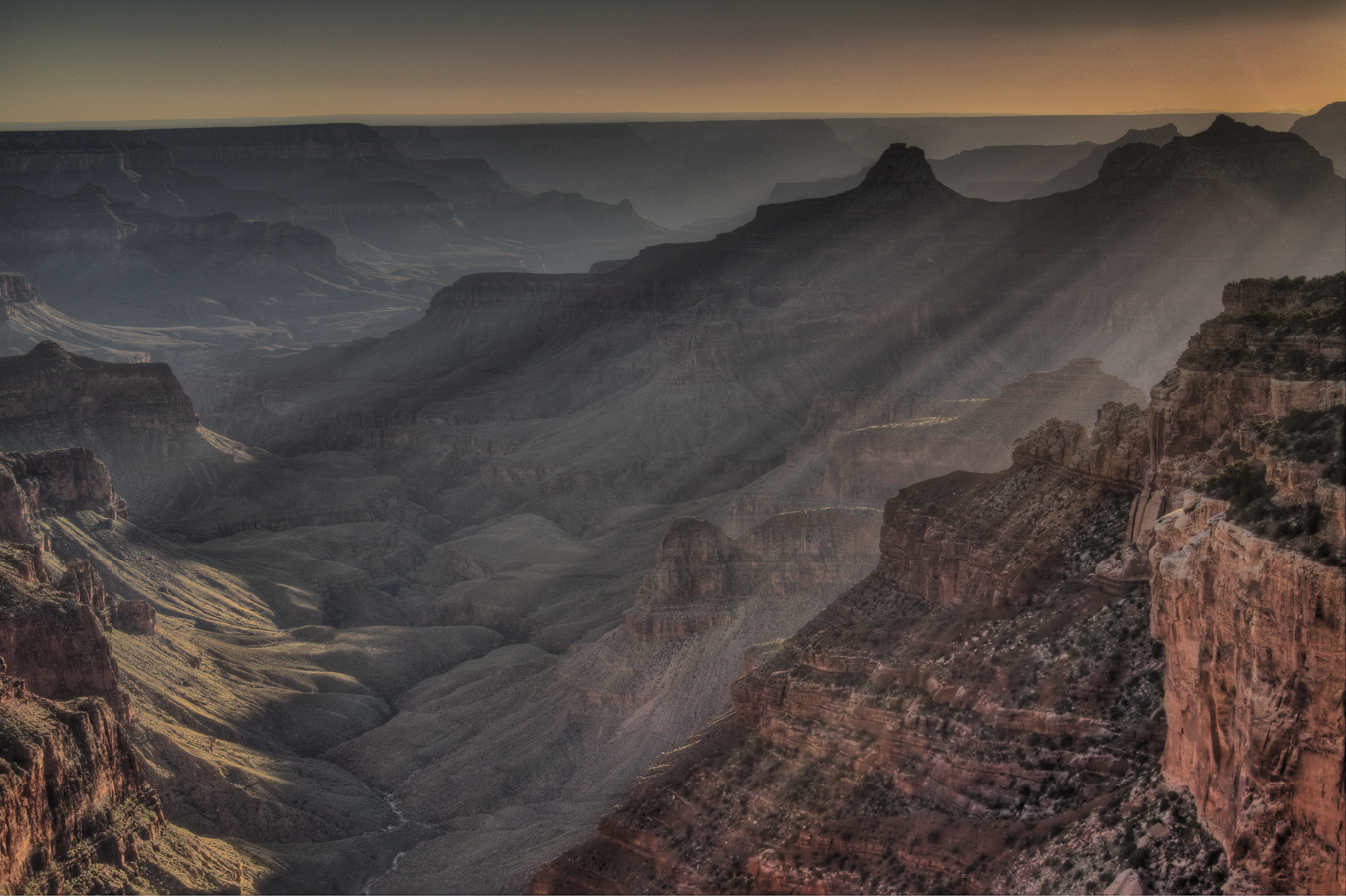
Cape Royal in late afternoon light

The Cape Royal Trail is a hiking trail on the North Rim of the Grand Canyon National Park, located in the U.S. state of Arizona.

== Access ==
The paved trail begins in the parking area at the southern end of Cape Royal Road on the north rim.

== Description ==
From the parking area, the trail heads south with signs describing the views and the local flora. Viewpoints along the trail include Angel's window (a natural arch), and Cape Royal itself at the end of the trail. The trail is ½ mile (0.8 km) in length, making a 1-mile (1.6 km) round trip.

== See also ==
- The Grand Canyon
- List of trails in Grand Canyon National Park
