= New Hance Trail =

Grand Canyon hiking trail

Coordinates: 36.02028°N 111.92944°W

New Hance Trail (a.k.a. Red Canyon Trail)
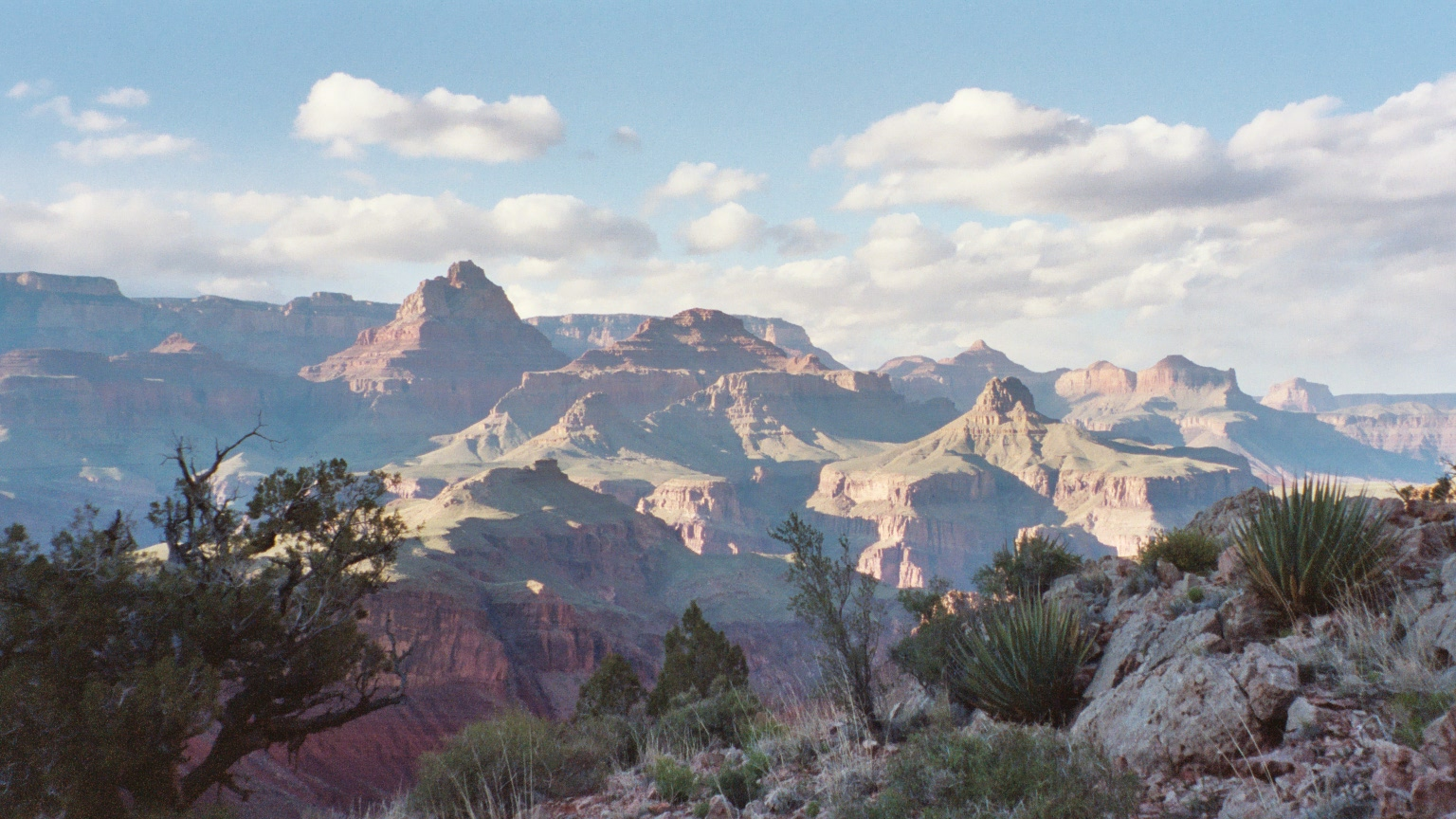
- The view of the Grand Canyon seen from the New Hance Trail.
- Location: Grand Canyon National Park, Arizona, United States
- Use: Hiking
- Sights: Grand Canyon
- Hazards: Severe Weather; Overexertion; Dehydration; Flash Flood

The New Hance Trail (a.k.a. Red Canyon Trail) is a hiking trail on the South Rim of the Grand Canyon National Park, located in the U.S. state of Arizona. It is one of the "unmaintained" trails and, along with the similar Tanner Trail, is considered one of the most difficult trails on the South Rim. Unlike the Tanner Trail, there is no parking available at the trailhead, which is located about a 5-minute walk north of the South Rim main road. The trail ends at the Hance Rapids on the Colorado River. It is approximately 6.5 hiking miles and a 4400' descent from the South Rim main road at ~7040' to the Colorado River at ~2600' elevation.

This trail has become used more in recent years. It is no longer only marked by the occasional cairn. While it remains a very rugged trail, the New Hance is now a real single track trail that is very distinct and relatively straightforward to follow the entire way from the South Rim Drive down to the river. Well-engineered switchbacks and other trail maintenance indicate that significant work, however irregularly, has been done on the trail over the years since John Hance first created the trail in the 1890s.

The top one mile is the steepest and most rugged part of the trail, featuring hard switchbacks down a steep slope and numerous big step downs, two to four feet high, that must be carefully negotiated. Below the top one mile, the big steps become fewer in number and farther apart, and the trail becomes progressively less steep. However, occasional steep stretches and big steps may still be found along the entire length of the trail. There are a couple of isolated spots in the bottom wider areas of Red Canyon where the trail splits into multiple paths but they eventually converge again after a relatively short distance.

While rugged and somewhat challenging to navigate, the New Hance Trail does not require specialized technical skills or equipment. It has graduated to a full-fledged "hiking trail". The trail's ruggedness and remote location has placed it out of reach of most tourists, so the New Hance Trail is almost exclusively used by overnight hikers and the occasional day hiker, typically well trained and properly prepared.

There is no reliable source of water between the TH and the Colorado River. The small creeks and springs in the lower portions of Red Canyon may be flowing early in the year. However, the GCNP issues a warning on back country permits noting that the spring water may exceed municipal water standards for arsenic.

== See also ==
- The Grand Canyon
- List of trails in Grand Canyon National Park
