= Escalante Route =

Grand Canyon hiking trail

Coordinates: 36.104°N 111.834°W

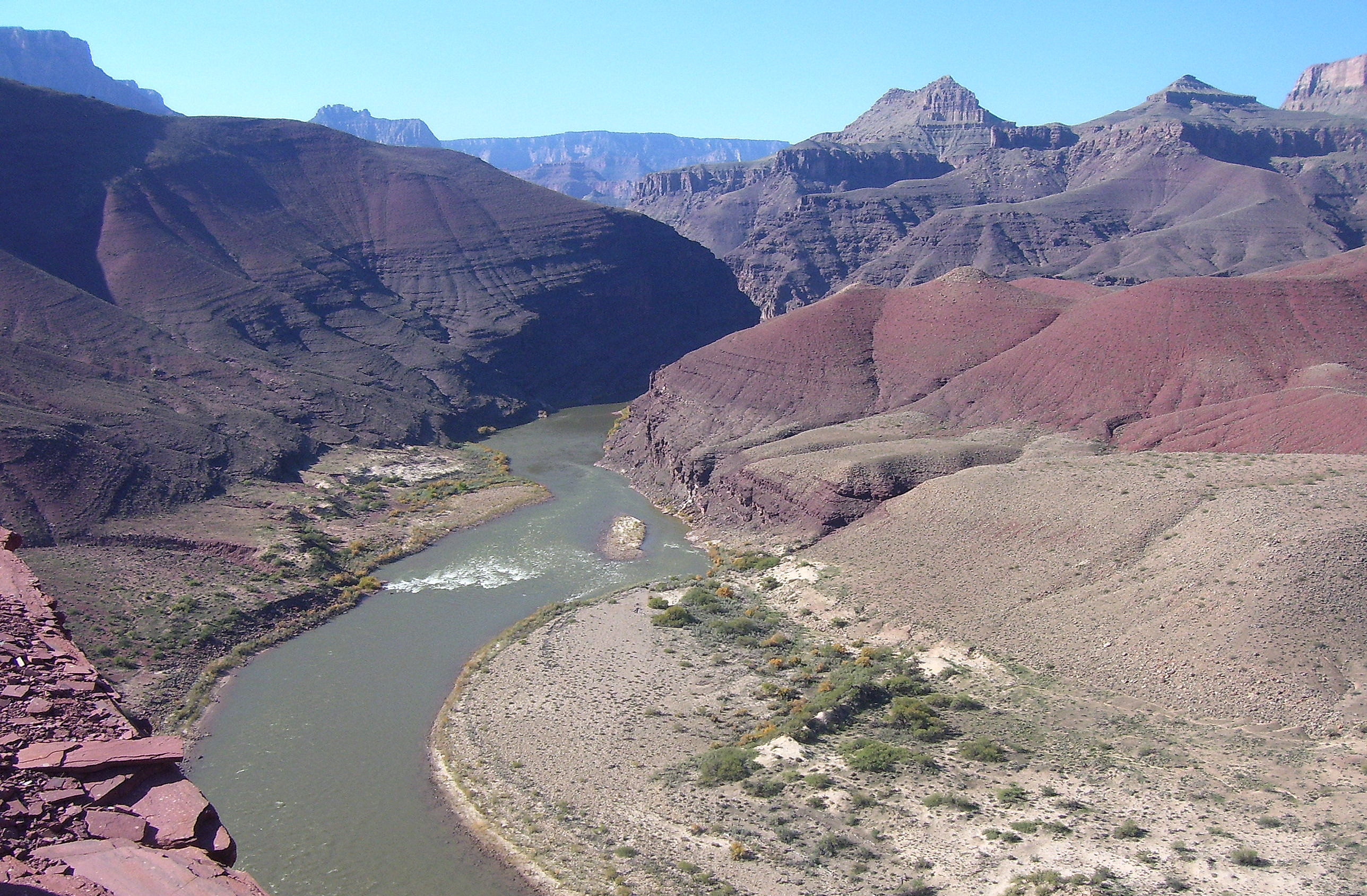
- The Colorado River seen from the Escalante Route
- Location: Grand Canyon National Park, Arizona, United States
- Use: Hiking
- Sights: Grand Canyon
- Hazards: Severe Weather; Overexertion; Dehydration; Flash Flood

The Escalante Route is a hiking trail on the South Rim of the Grand Canyon National Park, located in the U.S. state of Arizona. It starts near the Tanner Rapids (Tanner Graben) on the Colorado River and follows the river. It also passes by Escalante Creek and ends near the Hance Rapids. It falls into the lowest maintenance category ("route") of the Grand Canyon trails which means it is essentially unmaintained. There is a 30-feet cliff located near the Hance Rapids, popularly known as the Papago Wall, which needs to be climbed. The National Park Service advises to bring a rope for backpacks. There are several other easy, yet avoidable climbing opportunities in 75 Mile Canyon, some of which have been marked by cairns.

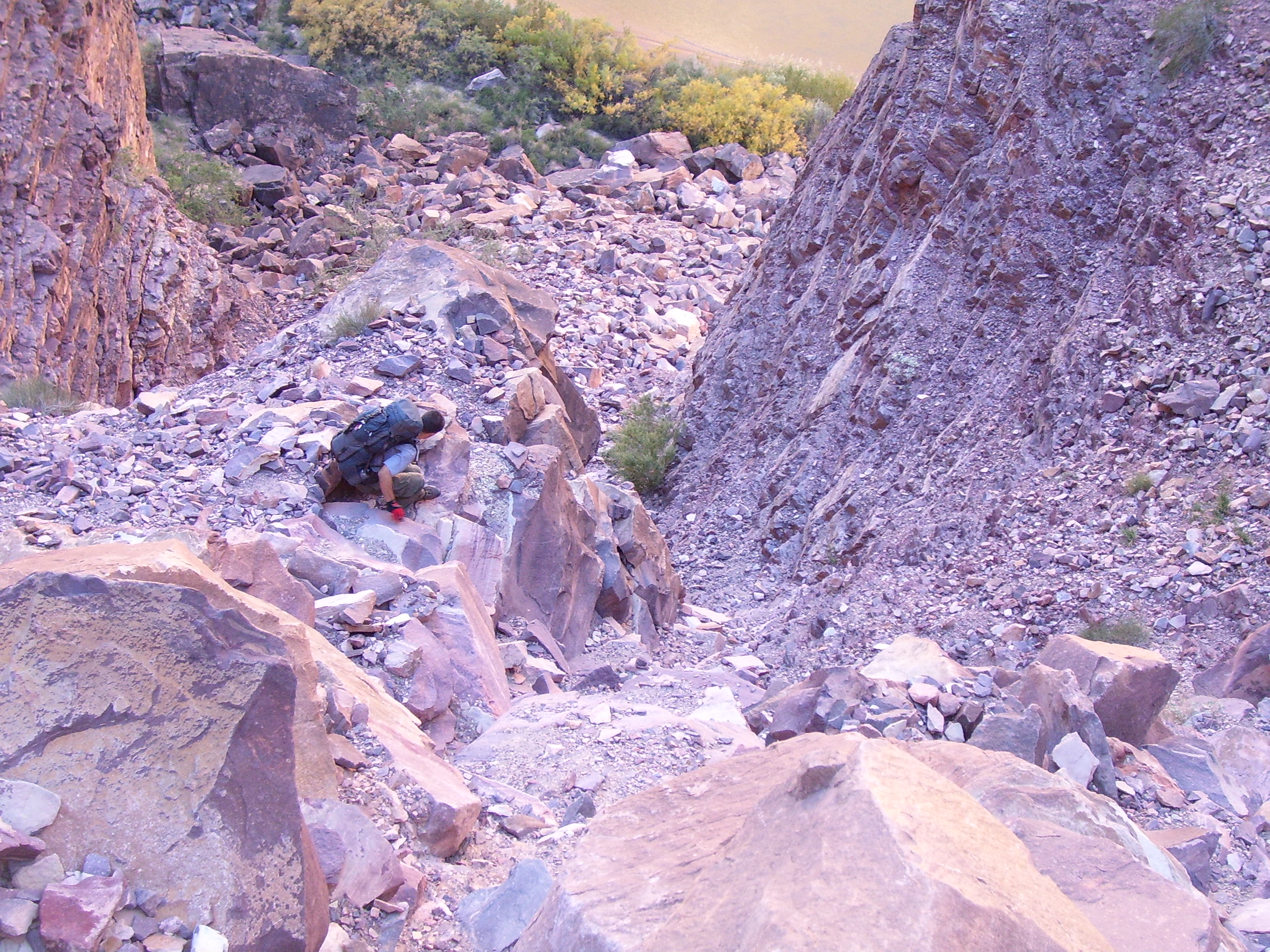
The rock slide located at the end of the Escalante Route

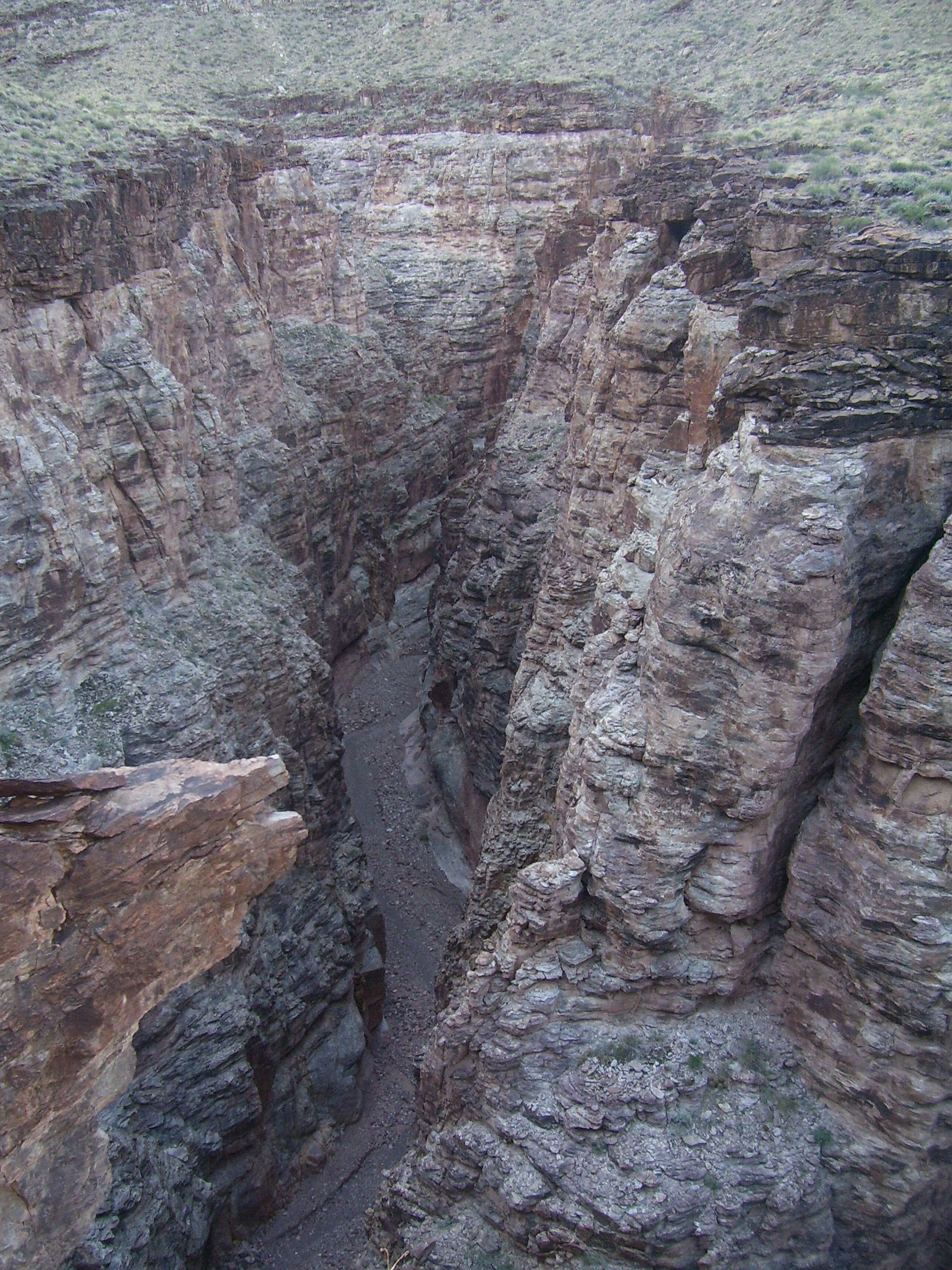
The slot canyon (75-mile Canyon) located along the Escalante Route

== See also ==
- List of Colorado River rapids and features
- The Grand Canyon
- List of trails in Grand Canyon National Park
