= Royal Arch Route =

Grand Canyon hiking trail

Coordinates: 36.19°N 112.45°W

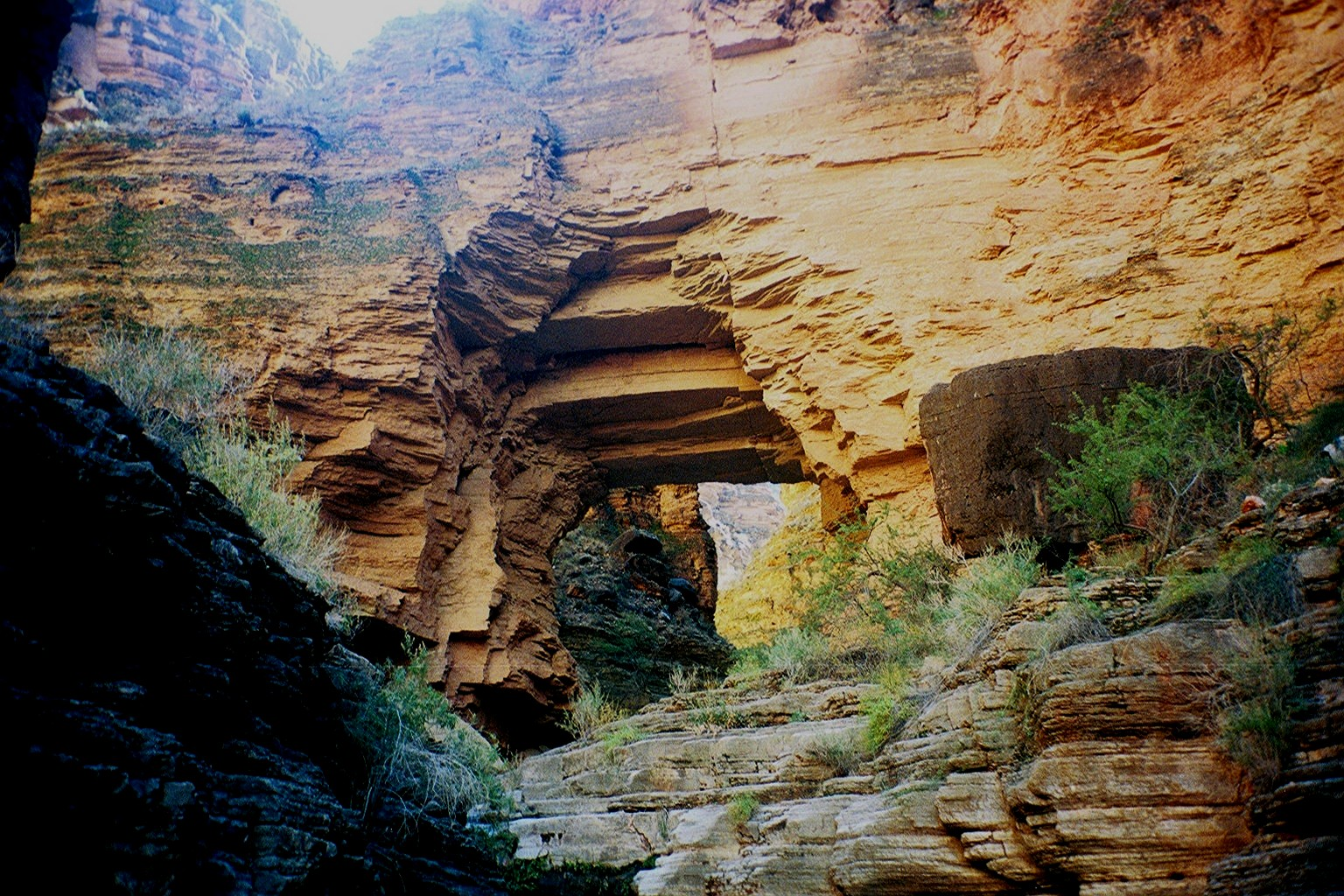
- The Royal Arch above Elves Chasm
- Location: Grand Canyon National Park, Arizona, United States
- Trailheads: South Bass Trail; Tonto Trail (West); Grand Canyon (South Rim)
- Use: Hiking; Backpacking
- Elevation change: 4,506 ft (1,373 m)
- Highest point: South Rim, 6,646 ft (2,026 m)
- Lowest point: Colorado River, 2,140 ft (650 m)
- Difficulty: Expert
- Season: Early Spring to Late Fall
- Sights: Grand Canyon; Royal Arch; Colorado River; Elves Chasm
- Hazards: Severe Weather; Overexertion; Dehydration; Flash Flood

The Royal Arch Route is a hiking trail on the South Rim of the Grand Canyon National Park, located in the U.S. state of Arizona.

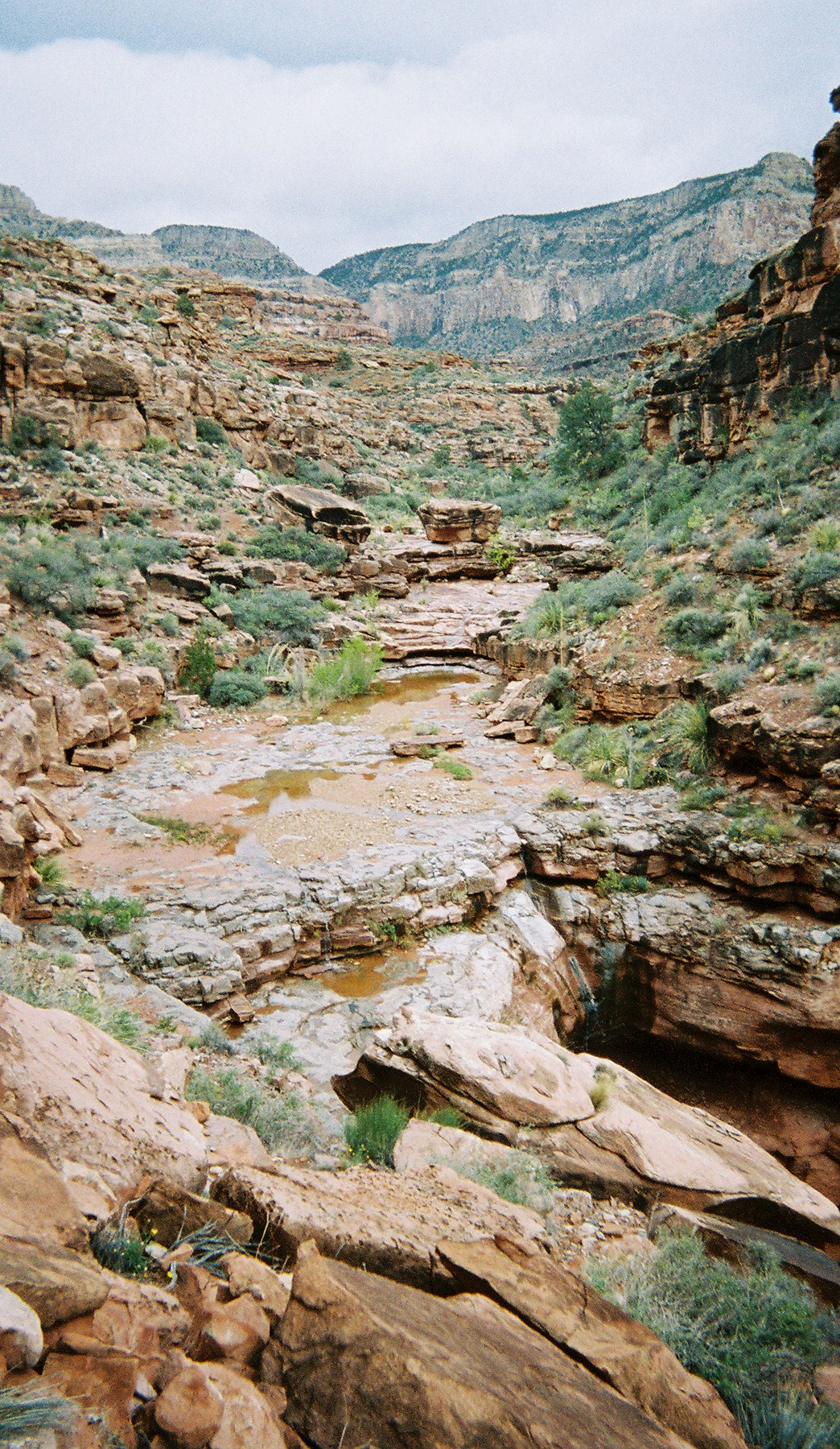
A side canyon/drainage where part of the Royal Arch Route is located.

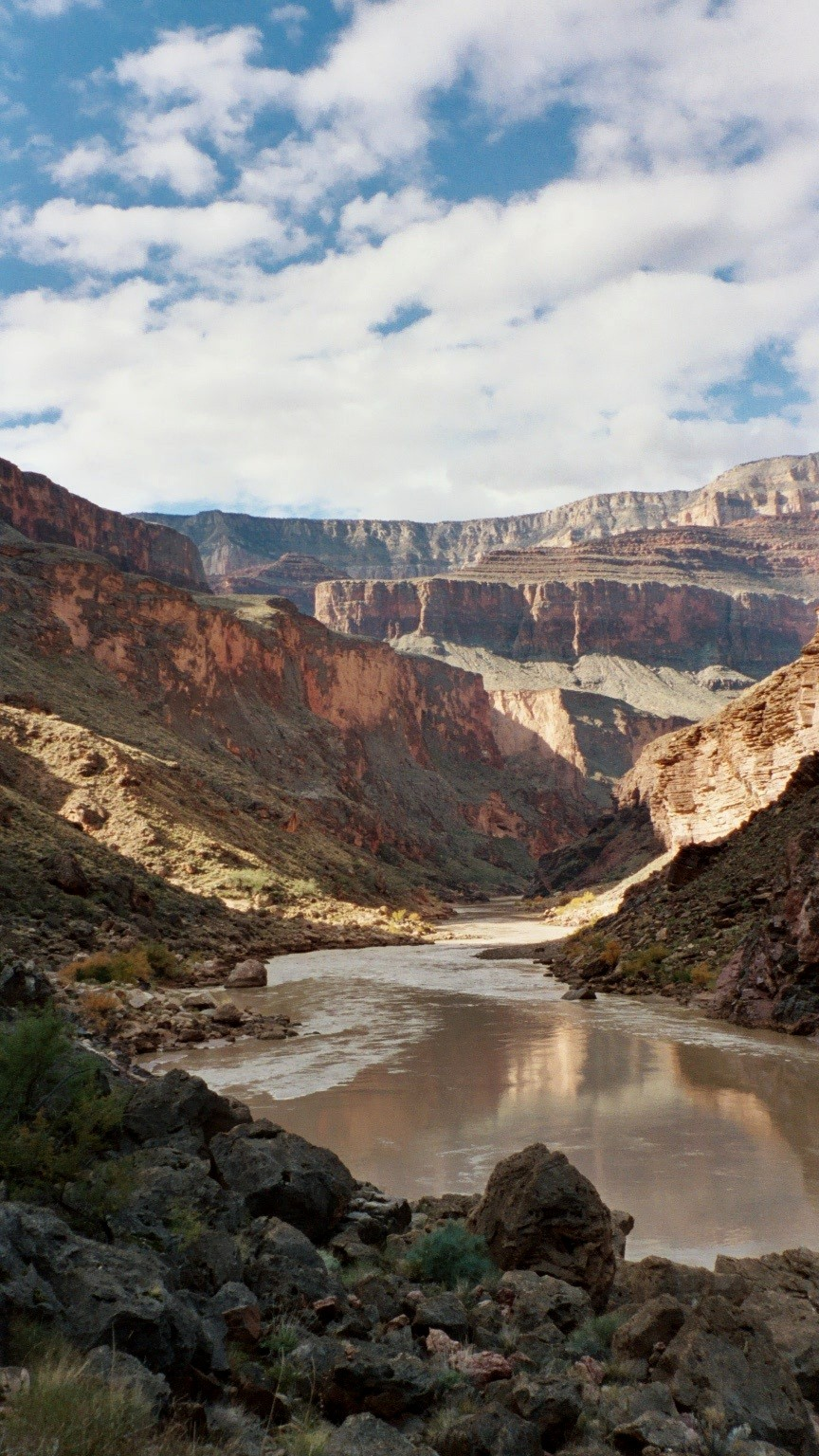
The location of the start of the west Tonto Trail and the end of the Royal Arch Route along the Colorado River.

== See also ==
- The Grand Canyon
- List of trails in Grand Canyon National Park
