= Beamer Trail =

Backpacking trail in Grand Canyon National Park

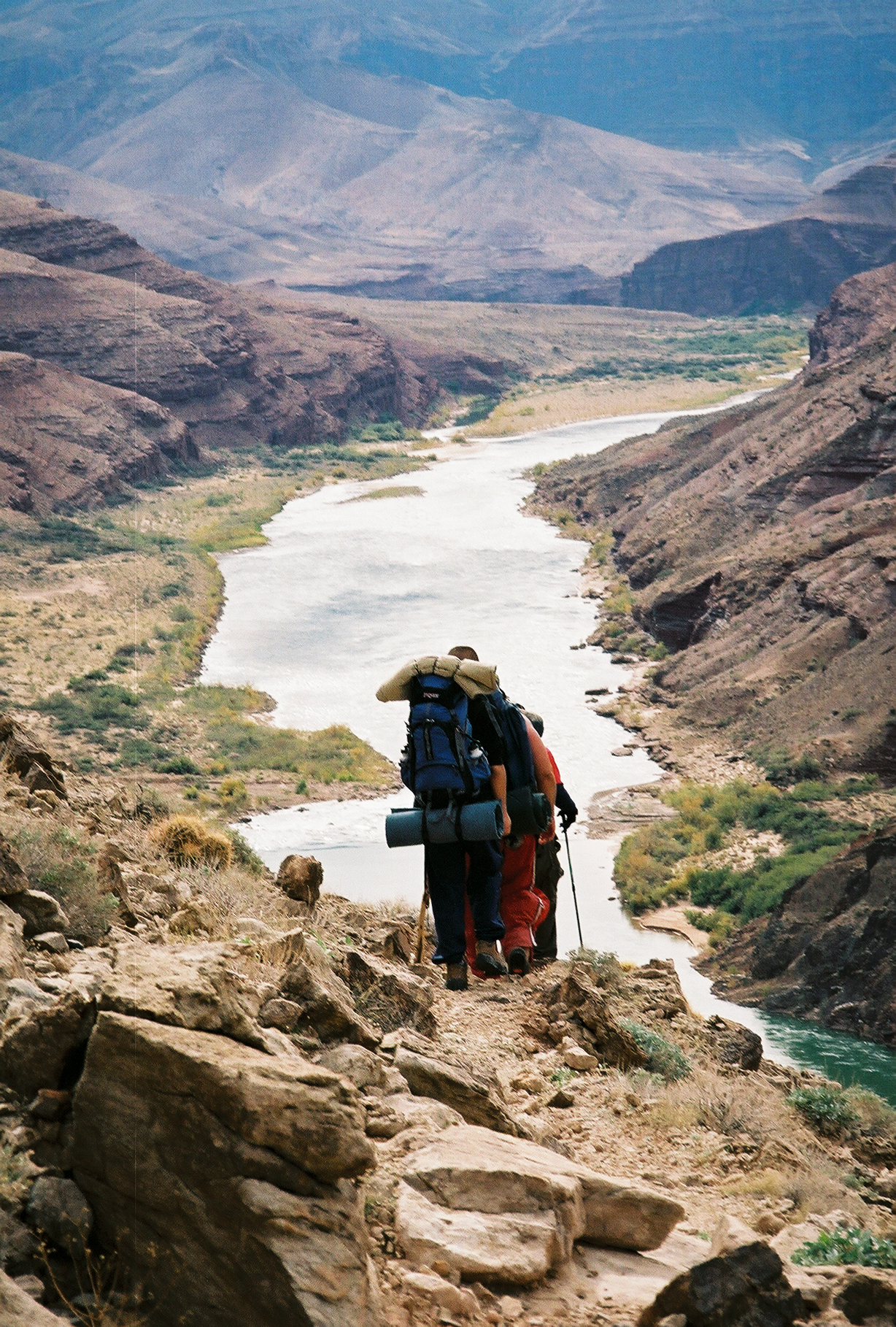
- Hikers walking along the Beamer Trail, with the Colorado River in the distance.
- Location: Grand Canyon National Park, Arizona, United States
- Trailheads: Colorado River
- Use: Hiking
- Sights: Grand Canyon
- Hazards: Severe Weather; Overexertion; Dehydration; Flash Flood

The Beamer Trail is a backpacking trail located on the South Rim of the Grand Canyon National Park, located in the U.S. state of Arizona.

== Description ==
The trail begins at the end of the Tanner Trail, at the confluence of Tanner Creek and the Colorado River. This confluence created the Unkar Creek Rapids. From here the trail follows the Colorado north (upstream) to its confluence with the Little Colorado River. The trail is considered primitive, and some route finding is required. To the east of the trail is the Palisades of the Desert, a two-thousand foot cliff that showcases the upper portion of the canyon's rock layers.

Camping is not allowed within a ½ mile of the confluence of the Colorado River and the Little Colorado River. Elsewhere along the trail, at-large camping is allowed by permit only from the park's Backcountry Information Center.

== See also ==
- The Grand Canyon
- List of trails in Grand Canyon National Park
