= Thunder River (Tapeats Creek tributary) =

River in the Grand Canyon National Park, Arizona

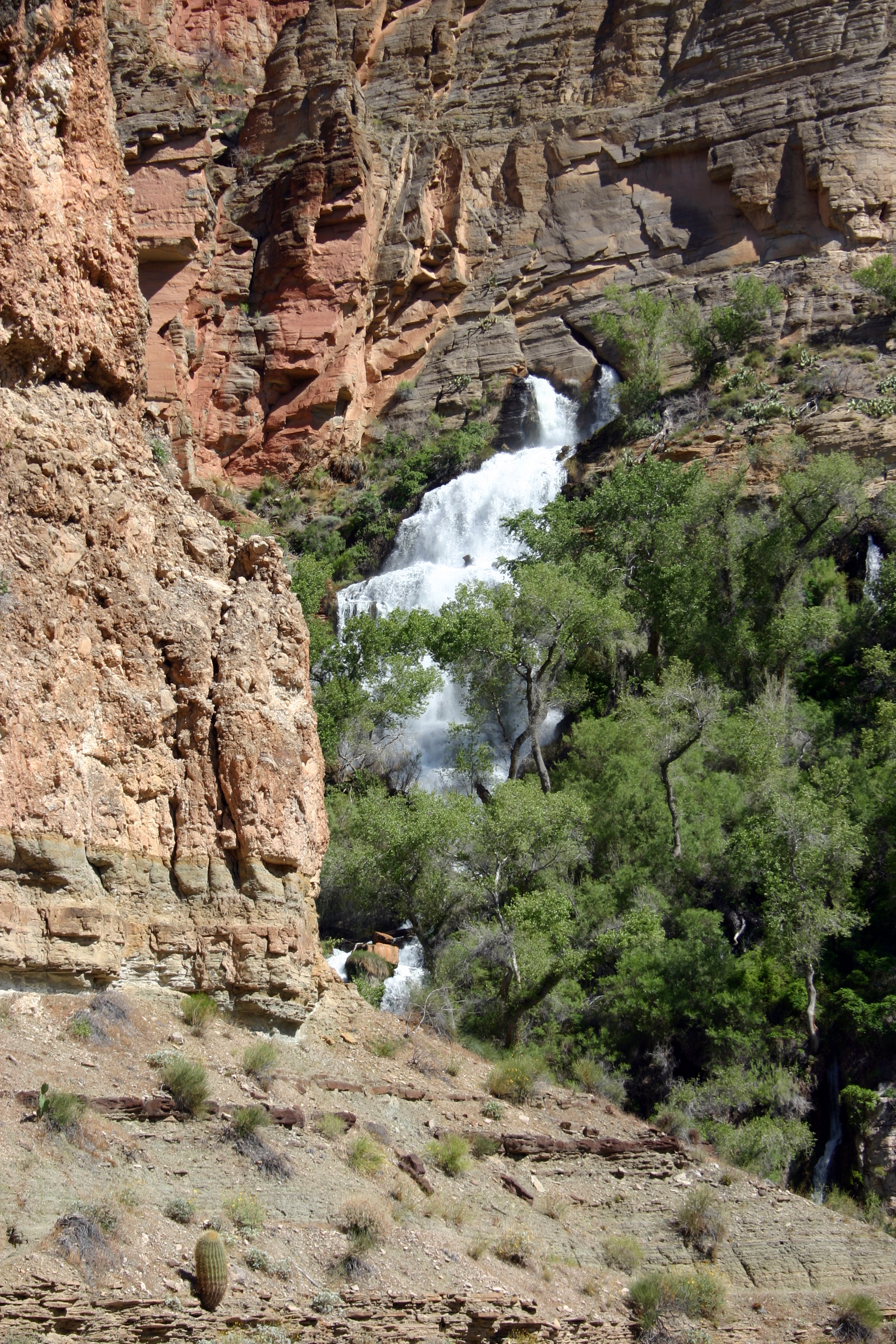
- Thunder River in the Grand Canyon National Park

- Location of the mouth of Thunder River in Arizona

Location
- Country: United States
- State: Arizona
- County: Coconino

Physical characteristics
- Source: Thunder Springs
  - location: Grand Canyon (North Rim)
  - coordinates: 36.3958°N 112.4578°W
- Mouth: Tapeats Creek
  - location: Grand Canyon
  - coordinates: 36.3919°N 112.4513°W
  - elevation: 2,549 feet (777 m)

Thunder River is a river entirely within the Grand Canyon National Park. It flows southeast from its source near the North Rim of the canyon to Tapeats Creek. The 0.5-mile-long (0.80 km) river is one of the shortest in the United States, (Note: Some sources claim it is the shortest river in the world.) and drops approximately 1,200 feet (370 m) over a series of waterfalls, making it the steepest river in the country. (Note: The entire system of Thunder River and Tapeats Creek has sometimes been called Thunder River.) It is also a rare instance where a river is a tributary of a creek.

== History ==
While Tapeats Creek was named by the second Powell Expedition in the winter of 1871–1872, the expedition did not discover Thunder River; European-American discovery of the river did not occur until 1904. The river can be reached by Thunder River Trail from the North Rim, which is only accessible from mid-May to late October. The upper portions of the trail were originally built in 1876 when rumors of placer gold led speculators to need a way into the area. Further trail work was performed beginning in 1925 under the US Forest Service and continued under the National Park Service with the final sections to Tapeats Creek completed in 1939.

== Source ==
The creek is fed from Thunder Spring, the second-largest spring on the North Rim. Water emerges from the Muav Limestone in a deep cave system at approximately 54 °F (12 °C). Since the spring flows year round, the river is a perennial river. In 1970, the spring was estimated to discharge twenty-one million US gal (79,000,000 L; 17,000,000 imp gal) of water per day into the river.

== Environment ==
Common trees near the spring include Fremont's cottonwoods and white sumac. Along the river are willows, seepwillows, other shrubs, crimson monkeyflower, maidenhair fern and other riparian fauna. Common aquatic invertebrate found in the creek include stoneflies and caddisflies.

== See also ==
- List of rivers of Arizona
- Wallkill River, in New Jersey and New York, also drains into a creek.
