= Thunder River Trail =

Grand Canyon hiking trail

Coordinates: 36.39194°N 112.45056°W

- Length: 17.7 mi (28.5 km)
- Location: Grand Canyon National Park, Arizona, United States
- Trailheads: Colorado River; Indian Hollow, Grand Canyon North Rim
- Use: Hiking; Backpacking
- Elevation change: 4,400 ft (1,300 m)
- Highest point: North Rim, 6,400 ft (2,000 m)
- Lowest point: Colorado River, 2,000 ft (610 m)
- Difficulty: Strenuous
- Season: Early Spring to Late Fall
- Sights: Grand Canyon; Colorado River; Thunder River; Tapeats Creek
- Hazards: Severe Weather; Overexertion; Dehydration; Flash Flood

The Thunder River Trail is a hiking trail on the North Rim of the Grand Canyon National Park, located in the U.S. state of Arizona.

== Description ==
Length (mi)	Elv (ft)	Location	Connecting trails	Water
0	6400	Trailhead	None	None
7	5350	Trail Junction	Bill Hall Trail	Seasonal
14	3650	Trail Junction	Deer Creek Trail	Seasonal
17	2000	Colorado River	Colorado River Trail	Perennial

== History ==
The upper portions of the trail were originally built in 1876 when rumors of placer gold led speculators to need a way into the area. Further trail work was performed beginning in 1925 under the US Forest Service and continued under the National Park Service with the final sections to Tapeats Creek completed in 1939. The trail was closed to all motorized vehicles effective July 1, 1962 due to safety concerns for both vehicle riders and hikers.

== See also ==
- The Grand Canyon
- List of trails in Grand Canyon National Park
