= Louis Boucher =

American miner

Louis Boucher was a Canadian-born American prospector, miner, explorer, and guide in the Grand Canyon, Arizona in the late 19th to early 20th century.

== Life ==
Louis Boucher was an American prospector who sought fortune in the Western US during the mid-1800s. Along with many others, Boucher left Canada during the gold rush. During his journey from the West to the Cariboo and Fraser areas of Canada, Boucher became familiar with the use of mules for transportation and gear-hauling. After a failed stint of gold prospecting in Cariboo, Boucher turned his attention to the southwest, seeking silver. Boucher eventually worked his way to the area now known as Arizona around 1889, and found work as a Grand Canyon guide for Hance Ranch, where he provided mule rides for canyon visitors.

In 1891, Boucher decided to stake his own claim in the Grand Canyon, settling near Dripping Springs Basin, which provided a natural spring of fresh water to the canyon. Boucher built a camp for himself and a corral for his mules and sheep. Living in such an isolated area earned Boucher the nickname, "The Hermit." At one point during his occupation near Dripping Springs, Boucher assisted in the search and attempted rescue of two lost men in the canyon. He used the tools he knew best as a miner – explosives. Boucher reasoned that setting off dynamite explosions would attract the men toward the search party. However, this was not to be – the lost men had drowned in the Colorado River and their bodies were eventually found.

There was a small, yet sustainable copper mine beside Boucher's camp (now known as Hermit's Rest,) which enabled Boucher to support himself. Boucher later carved the Silver Bell Trail (in homage to Calamity Jane's signature silver bell), which stretched from Dripping Springs to Columbus Point and Boucher Canyon.

Boucher later developed his camp in other ways. He planted an orchard with 75 pomegranate, fig, and orange trees, supported by an irrigation system he created himself. He also built a number of cabins along his property for tourists to stay in.

In 1912, Louis Boucher left his home to seek work in a coal mine in Moreland, Utah, and never returned to his camp by Dripping Springs. (Moreland was abandoned due to unprofitable coal production in 1938.)
