= North Bass Trail =

Grand Canyon hiking trail

Coordinates: 36.336°N 112.34783°W

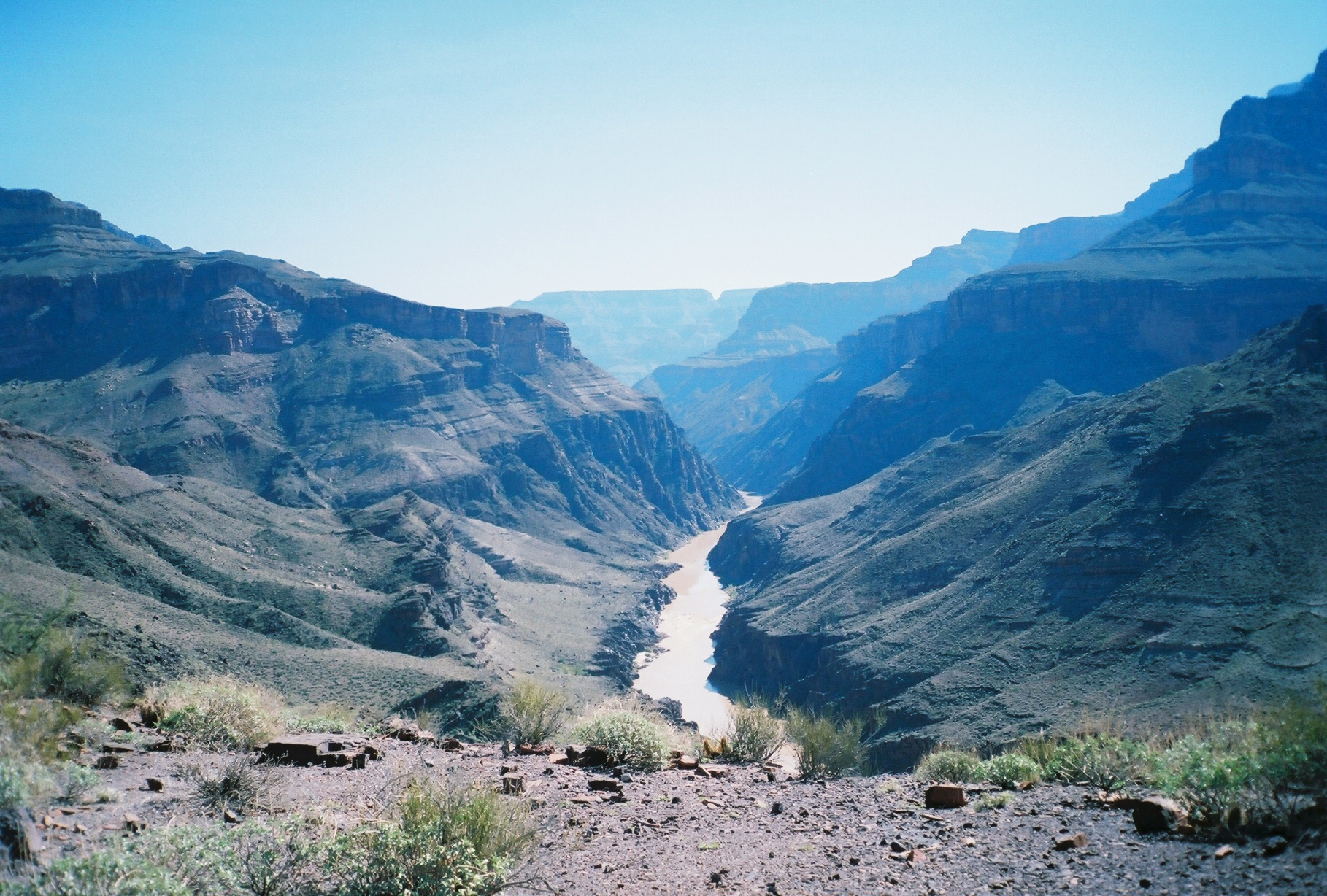
- The Colorado River viewed from the near-terminus of the North Bass Trail.
- Length: 13.5 mi; 22.7 km
- Location: Grand Canyon National Park, Arizona, United States
- Trailheads: North Rim; Colorado River; Grand Canyon (North Rim)
- Use: Hiking; Backpacking
- Elevation change: 5728 ft
- Highest point: North Rim, 7928 ft
- Lowest point: Colorado River, 2200ft
- Difficulty: Very Strenuous
- Season: Early Spring to Late Fall
- Sights: Grand Canyon; Colorado River
- Hazards: Severe Weather; Overexertion; Dehydration; Flash Flood

The North Bass Trail is a hiking trail located on the North Rim of the Grand Canyon, in Grand Canyon National Park, located in the U.S. state of Arizona.

== Access ==
The trail is accessible by use of U.S. Forest Service roads along the north rim of Grand Canyon. The trailhead is located in the remote backcountry of the forests on the canyon's the north rim. To reach it, an 18-mile drive by high-clearance (4-wheel drive preferred) vehicles is required. The trail begins at Swamp Point at an elevation of 7,500 feet at the end of Swamp Point Road.

== Description ==
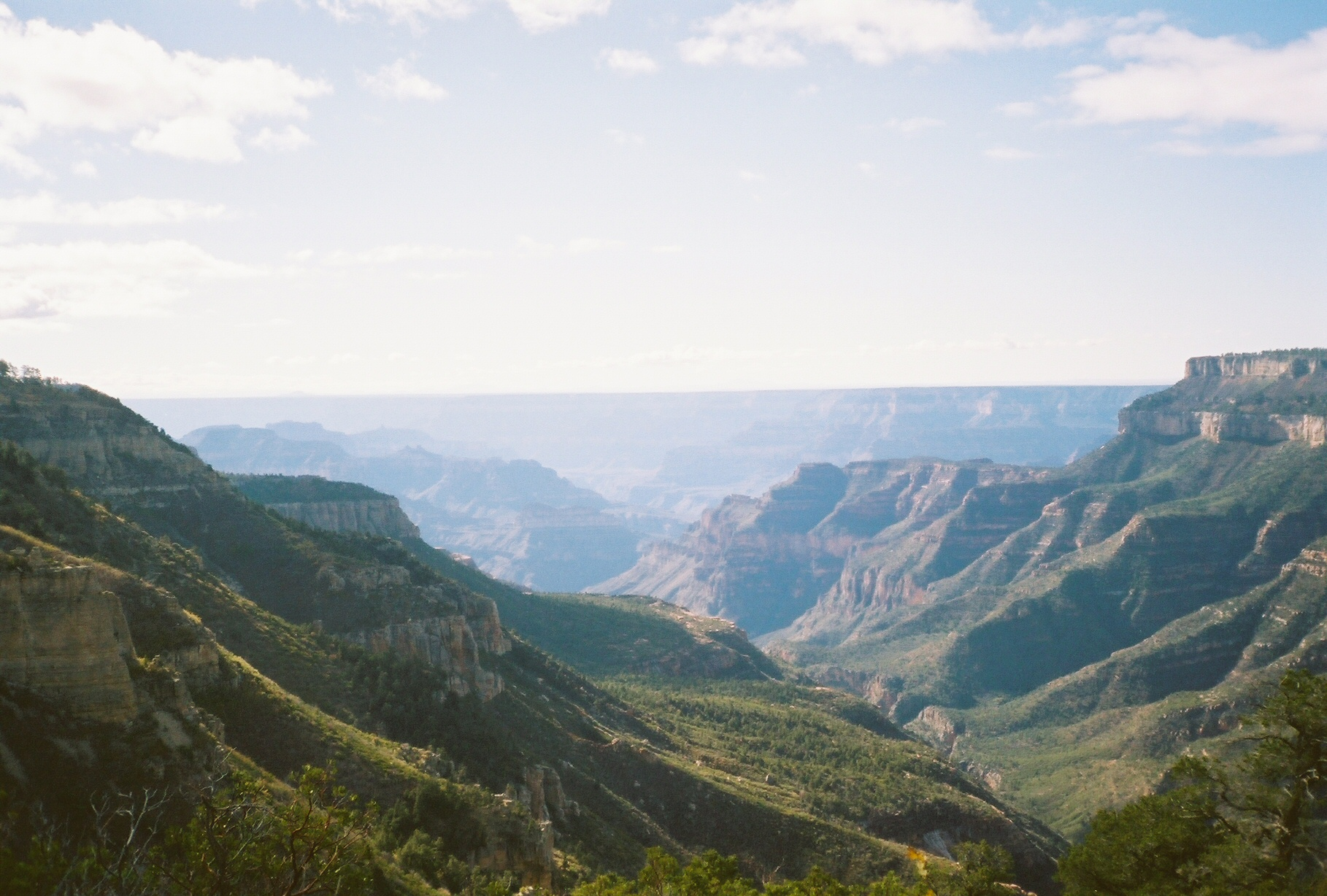
The canyon where the North Bass Trail is located.

This 14-mile trail is considered difficult, primarily due to length and elevation. Until recently the trail was very eroded and required considerable route-finding expertise. A major reconstruction effort by a volunteer crew in 2005 restored much of the original trailbed, improving travel and navigation, but still one of the Canyon's most strenuous trails and providing access to an exceptional wilderness area.

No services are available, water sources include perennial flow in Shinumo Creek and at the Colorado River, which must be treated before consuming.

== History ==
At one time, this trail was connected to the South Bass Trail via a cable and platform that crossed the Colorado River. The tramway no longer exists, and river crossing can only be made by raft.

== See also ==
- Geology of the Grand Canyon area
- List of trails in Grand Canyon National Park
- North Rim of the Grand Canyon
