= Hermit Trail =

Grand Canyon hiking trail

Coordinates: 36.06046°N 112.2122°W

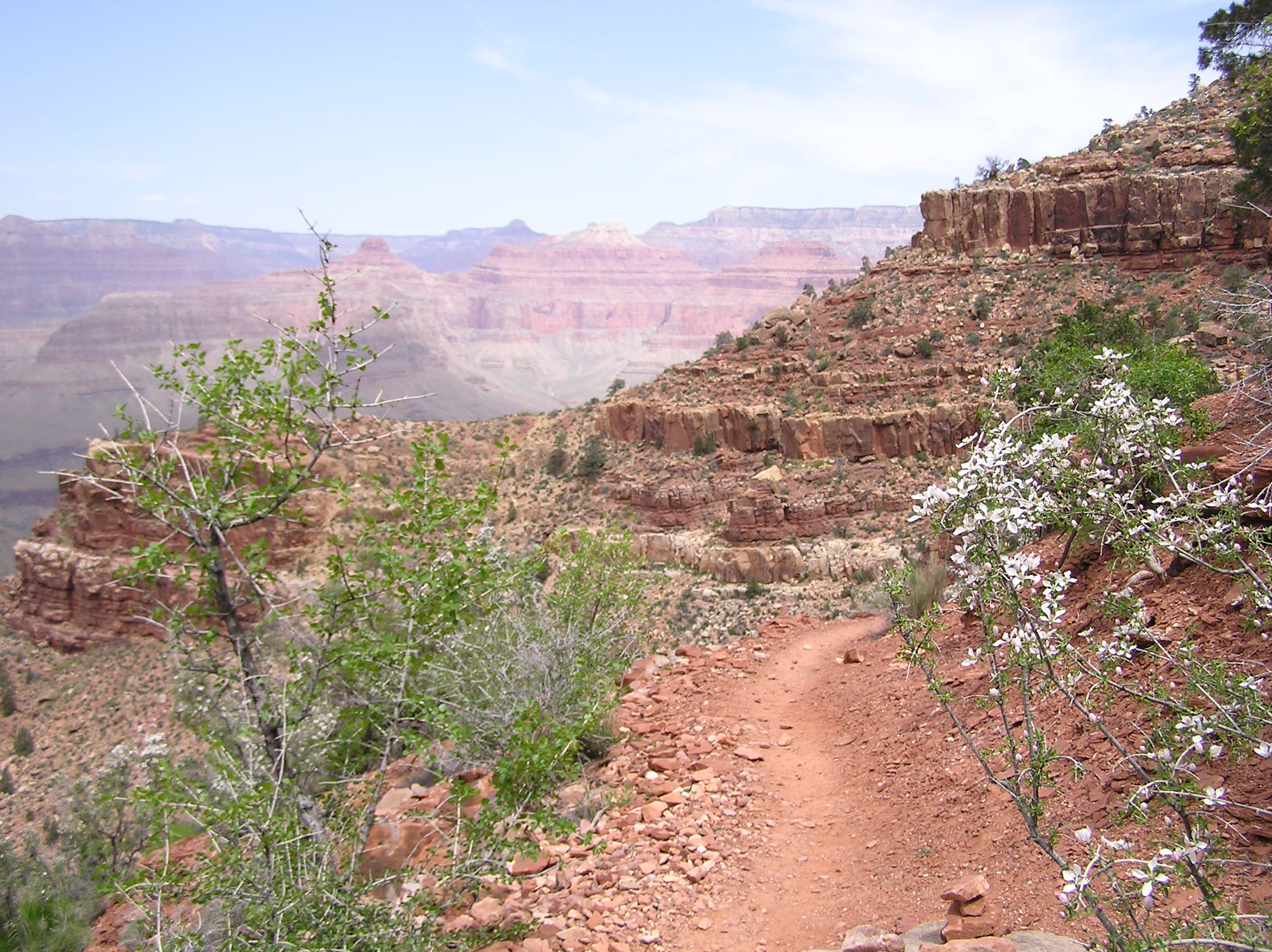
- Hermit Trail near Lookout Point
- Length: 8.9 mi (14.3 km)
- Location: Grand Canyon National Park, Arizona, United States
- Trailheads: Colorado River; Hermit's Rest, Grand Canyon South Rim
- Use: Hiking
- Elevation change: 4,240 ft (1,290 m)
- Highest point: South Rim, 6,640 ft (2,020 m)
- Lowest point: Colorado River, 2,400 ft (730 m)
- Difficulty: Very Strenuous
- Season: Year Round
- Sights: Grand Canyon; Colorado River
- Hazards: Severe Weather; Overexertion; Dehydration; Flash Flood

The Hermit Trail is a hiking trail in Grand Canyon National Park, located in the U.S. state of Arizona. This trail provides access to a historic area of Grand Canyon and offers a more challenging route to the Colorado River for more experienced canyon hikers.

== Access and description ==
The trailhead is located 0.25 miles (0.40 km) southwest of Hermit's Rest on the South Rim of the Grand Canyon. The trailhead is accessible by shuttle bus from Grand Canyon Village, Arizona on the Hermit Road. The road is closed to private vehicles between April and October annually but is open to all traffic other months. Two exceptions are for vehicles with government issued handicap placards and backpackers with valid permits for overnight camping in the Hermit use area. Those users can obtain the gate code by visiting the Backcountry Information Center in the park.

Mileages and features along the Hermit Trail
Distance (mi)	Elv (ft)	Location	Connecting trails	Toilet	Water
0	6640	Trailhead, Hermit's Rest	Rim Trail	Portable	
1.2	5400	Trail Junction	Waldron Trail		
1.6	5240	Trail Junction	Dripping Springs Trail		
2	4900	Santa Maria Spring			Ephemeral
4	4200	Lookout Point			
6.2	3120	Trail Junction	Tonto Trail East		
7.8	3040	Hermit Creek Campsite	Tonto Trail West	Composting	Hermit Creek, Perennial
8.9	2400	Hermit Rapids, Colorado River			Hermit Creek, Colorado River

=== Condition ===
Grand Canyon National Park categorizes the Hermit Trail as a threshold trail and does not officially maintain it. The trail is rutted in many places, and the once exquisite construction of placed stones on the upper half of the trail is now crumbling and rough.

Numerous rockslides cut through the trail and require rock scrambling and route finding to pass. The most recent major rockslide occurred in the evening of 1 March 1983, when a large section of rock in the Supai Group broke away from a cliff face and scattered down Hermit Canyon, cutting the Hermit Trail in two places. A rockslide that took place in the early 1930s cuts through the trail in a third place. These breaks in the trail require scrambling to get over, but are well marked with cairns.

=== Water availability ===
All water sources along this trail must be treated, filtered, or boiled before drinking.

Water is available year-round at Hermit Creek and the Colorado River. The trail between the Hermit Creek camping area and the Colorado River parallels Hermit Creek and provides additional water accessibility. Also, water flows periodically from Santa Maria Spring, located 2 trail miles in from the trailhead, but should not be counted on.

Hermit Creek above the Hermit Creek campsite is dry except in time of flood or flash flood.

The park's Backcountry Information Center has current water conditions for all water sources along the Hermit Trail.

=== Camping ===
There are two designated campsites in the Hermit Use Area. The three letter code indicates the park's use area designation:

- BM7 – Hermit Creek / Up to 23 persons for 1 group and 3 parties.
- BM8 – Hermit Rapids / Up to 17 persons for 1 group and 1 party.

Use permits are available on a first-come, first-served basis from the park's Backcountry Information Center. Requests are taken beginning on the 1st day of the month, up to four months before the requested first night of camping.

=== Hazards ===
Hazards hikers can encounter along the Hermit Trail include dehydration, sudden rainstorms, flash flooding, loose footing, rockfall, and extreme heat in the summer months. At the Colorado River, additional hazards include hypothermia (due to the river's consistently cold temperatures), trauma (due to collisions with boulders in rapids), and drowning.

== History ==
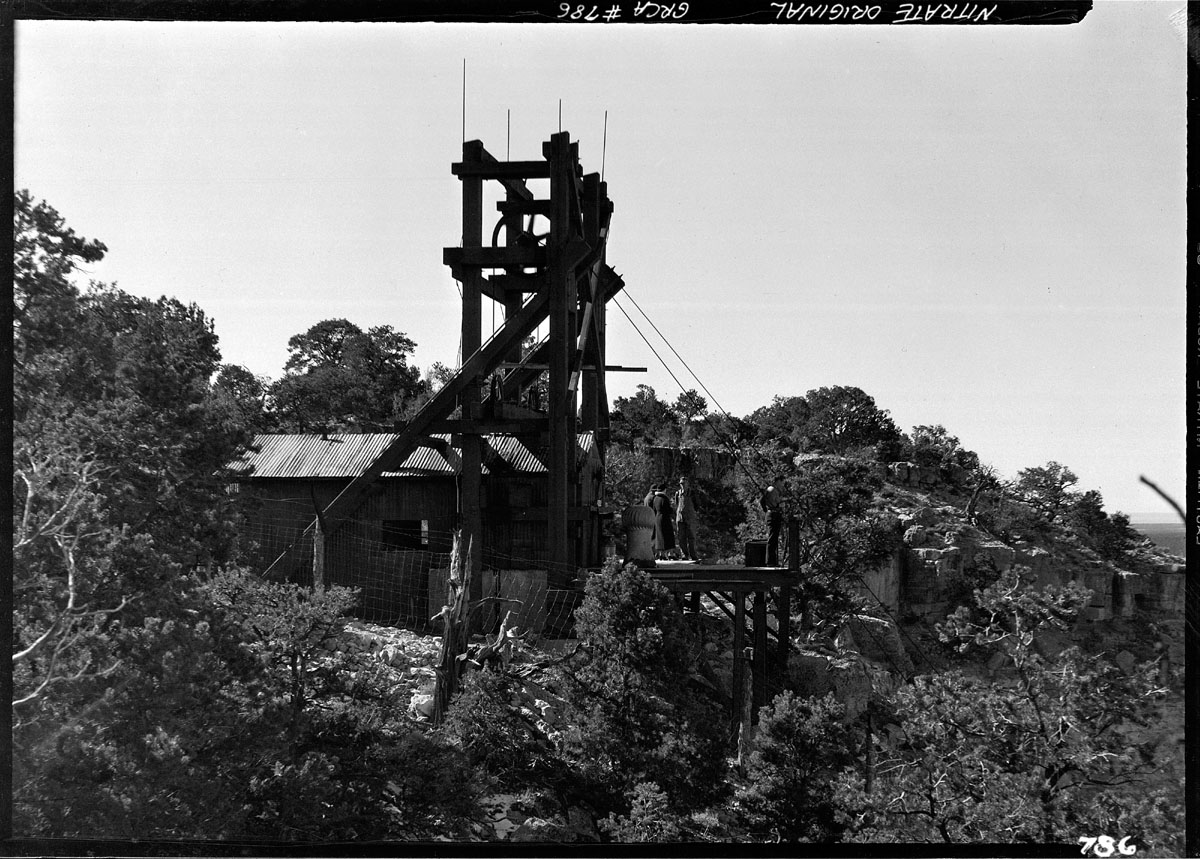
November 27, 1936 photo of the upper station of the tramway used to supply the AT&SF Hermit Camp from 1926 until its closure in the early 1930s.

This trail was built in the last decade of the 19th century by horsethieves, but was improved by different prospectors of that era. The Atchison, Topeka and Santa Fe Railway improved the trail further around 1910 to compete with the Camerons' Bright Angel Trail which charged a toll at the time. The railroad operated Hermit Camp, which included such amenities as electricity, showers, telephone service, and a freight tramway, about 7 trail miles below the rim until the 1930s when the National Park Service took over control of the Bright Angel Trail and officially rescinded its tolls.

== Geology ==
Major rocks along this trail include limestone, sandstone, chalk, chert, and other sedimentary rocks, as well as obsidian and igneous rocks. Rocks by the Colorado River are often heavily weathered. Some of the limestone is fossiliferous, mostly representing bivalves.

== See also ==
- List of trails in Grand Canyon National Park
