= Dragon Bravo Fire =

2025 wildfire in Arizona, USA

- Part of the 2025 Arizona wildfires
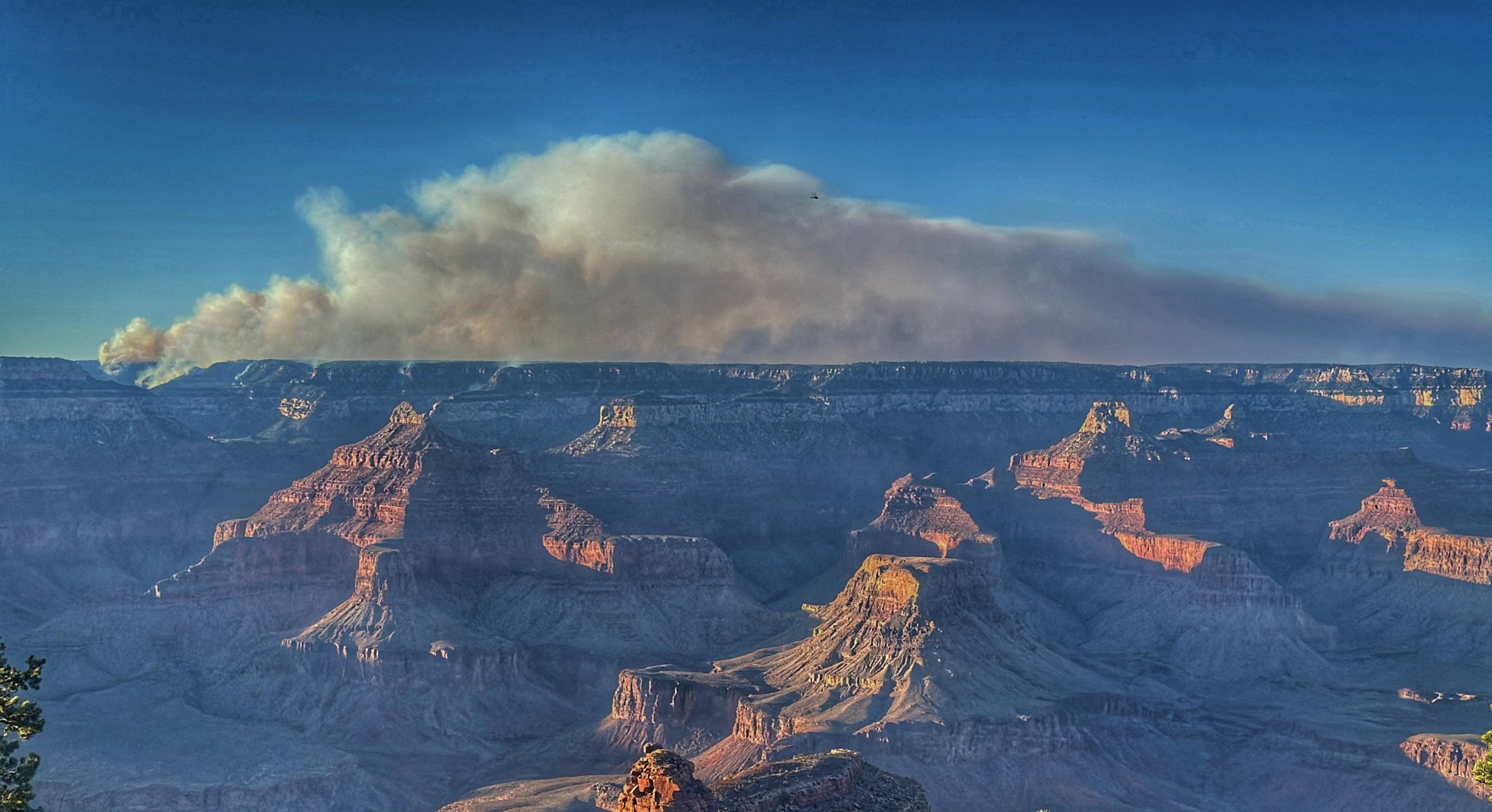
- The Dragon Bravo Fire seen from the South Rim of the Grand Canyon on July 30, 2025
- Date: July 4, 2025 – September 29, 2025
- Location: Grand Canyon North Rim
- Coordinates: 36°23′20.4″N 112°2′54.4″W

Statistics
- Perimeter: 100% contained
- Burned area: 145,504 acres (58,883 ha)

Impacts
- Deaths: 1
- Structures destroyed: 113 including Grand Canyon Lodge

Ignition
- Cause: Lightning

Map
- Perimeter of Dragon Bravo Fire (map data)
- Location in northern Arizona

The Dragon Bravo Fire was a megafire at the North Rim of Grand Canyon National Park in Arizona. The wildfire was started by lightning when a storm moved through the area July 3. . It was initially called in on July 4, 2025. On September 29, 2025, the fire was listed as 100% contained after burning 145,504 acres (58,883 ha). Fire suppression costs on that date reached $135,000,000. Total estimated suppression costs reached $141,047,987.

The fire destroyed 113 structures, including the historic Grand Canyon Lodge.

It became the 7th largest wildfire in Arizona history and was the largest wildfire in the United States excluding Alaska during the 2025 wildfire season.

== Background ==
Lightning and human-caused wildfires in the Grand Canyon historically thinned small, excessive vegetation but left large trees. Strict wildfire suppression tactics in the twentieth century that called for blazes to be immediately extinguished lead to immense overgrowth of native coniferous trees in the forests of the North Rim, creating a thick canopy above and littering the ground with pine needles. Grazing reduced the drier grasses that carried fire along the ground, both of these factors leading to more intense and destructive wildfires. Some estimates report the forests of the North Rim before the Dragon Bravo Fire were three times thicker than they were one century prior. The Dragon Bravo Fire burned through the largest contiguous stand of ponderosa pine in Arizona that have historically benefited from prescribed burns; quaking aspen, whose populations prevail at higher elevations and historically benefited from prescribed burns; pinyon-juniper woodlands, along the North Rim and in the Grand Canyon itself; sagebrush 3 to 10 feet (0.91 to 3.05 m) tall; and invasive grasses such as cheatgrass and buffelgrass that rapidly dry out. Grand Canyon National Park managers had plans for prescribed burns of 10,000 acres of what would become the Dragon Bravo Fire for the fall of 2027. Previous managed fires in the same ignition area occurred in 2005, 2012, and 2022.

The North Rim of the Grand Canyon saw only 50% of its average monsoon rain in the summer of 2024. This was followed by only 50% of average snowfall during the 2024-2025 winter. Prolonged drought conditions and repeated red flag warnings due to critically low humidity with little to no monsoon activity further heightened fire danger. Record setting temperatures at the North Rim in the mid 80s °F, combined with strong afternoon winds, contributed to the rapid spread of the Dragon Bravo Fire across the North Rim. According to the Arizona Department of Forestry and Fire Management, both live and dead fuel moisture was at historically low levels. Persistent rainfall deficits across the North Rim and surrounding areas accelerated flammability, while delayed monsoon storms failed to provide sufficient relief to moderate conditions.

== Events ==
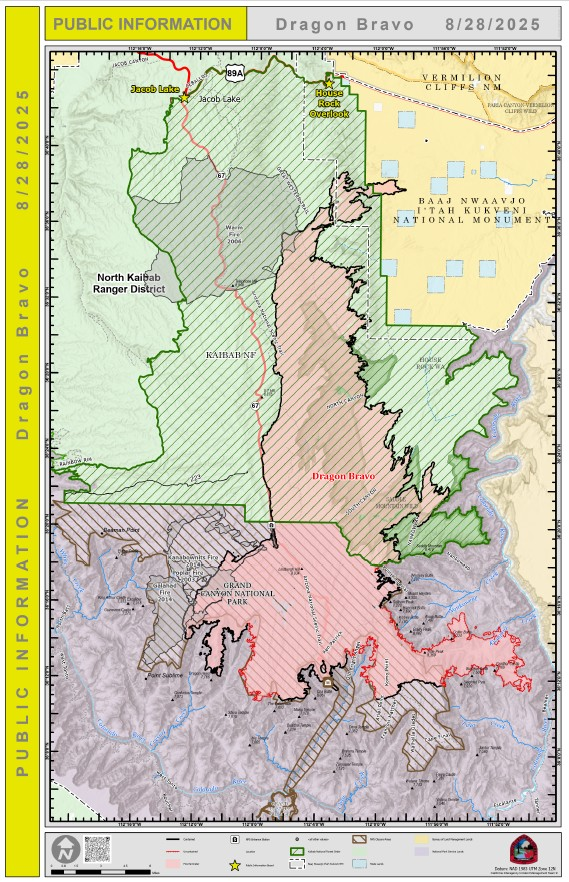
Dragon Bravo Fire Activity Map for August 28, 2025

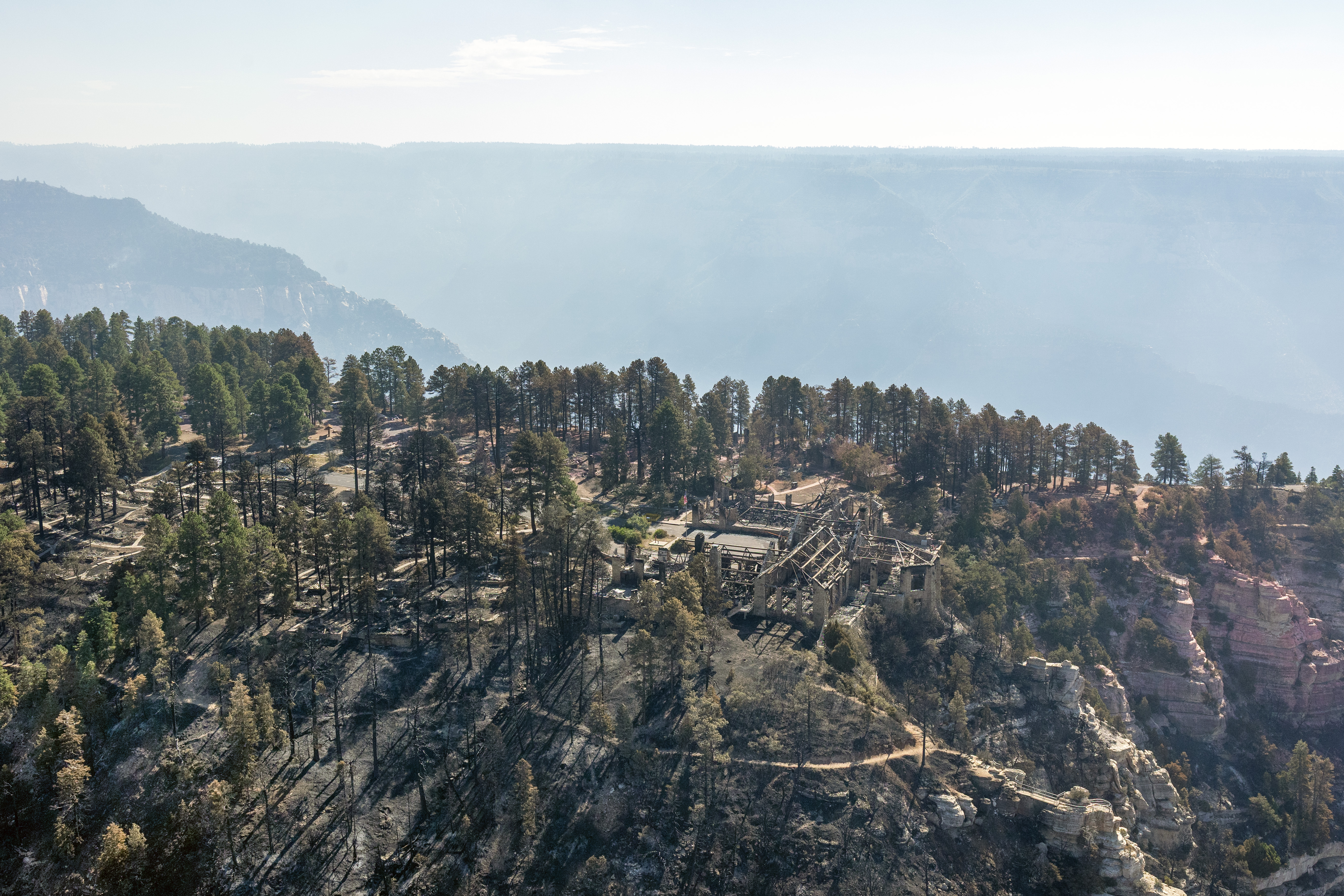
The Grand Canyon Lodge on July 18, 2025, after being destroyed by the Dragon Bravo Fire

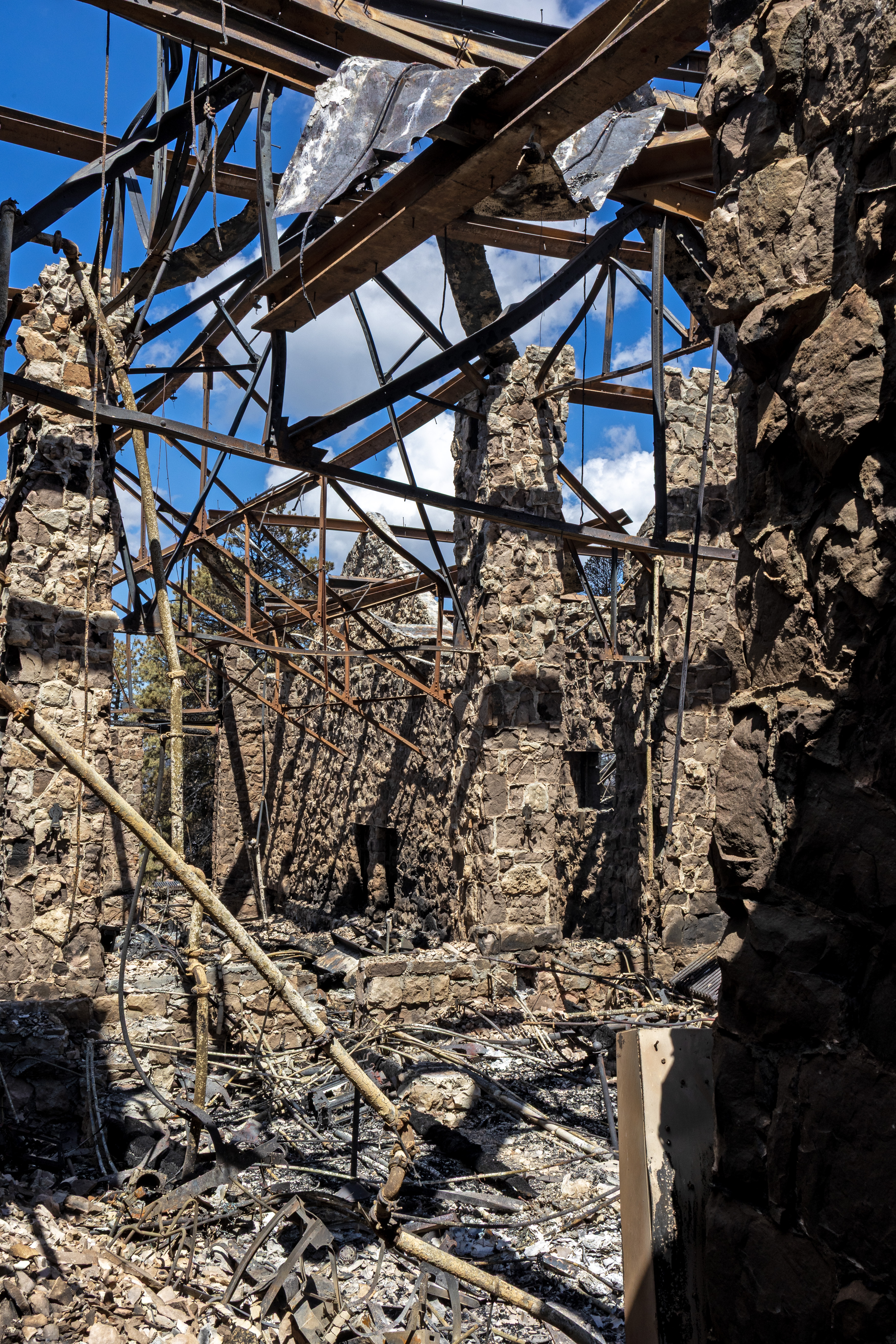
North Rim Lodge remains on July 18, 2025, after burning in the Dragon Bravo Fire on the night of July 12–13, 2025

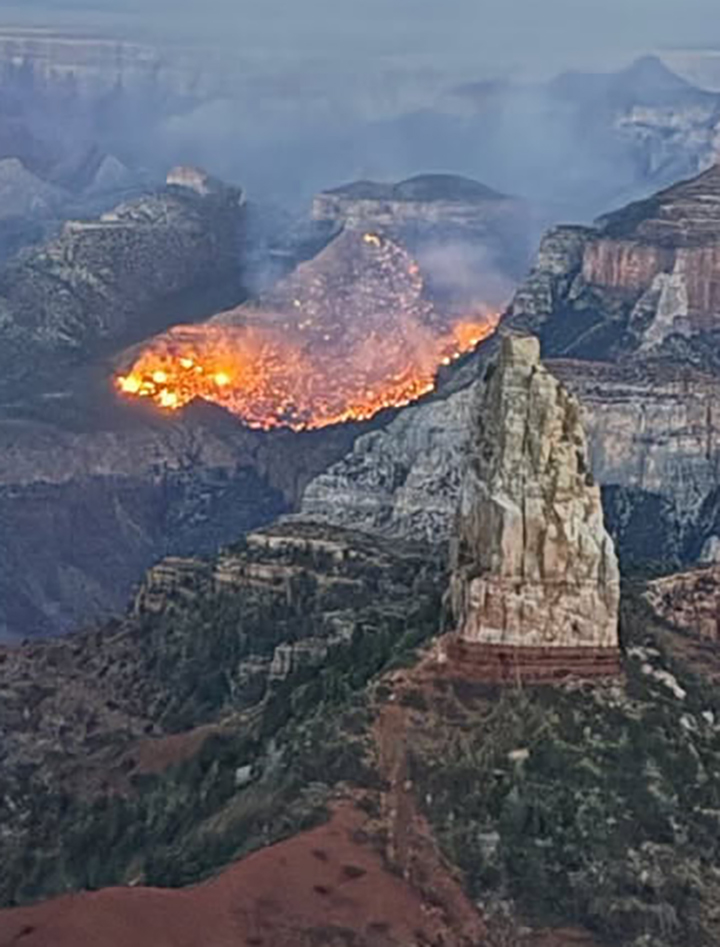
The view southeast from Point Imperial. Pinion, juniper, and ponderosa pine trees on the north slopes of the inner Grand Canyon burn on August 12, 2025

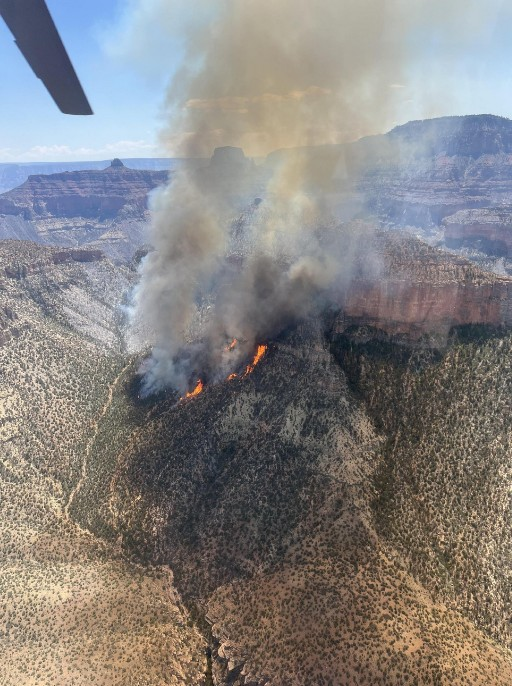
Dragon Bravo Fire in Grand Canyon August 15, 2025

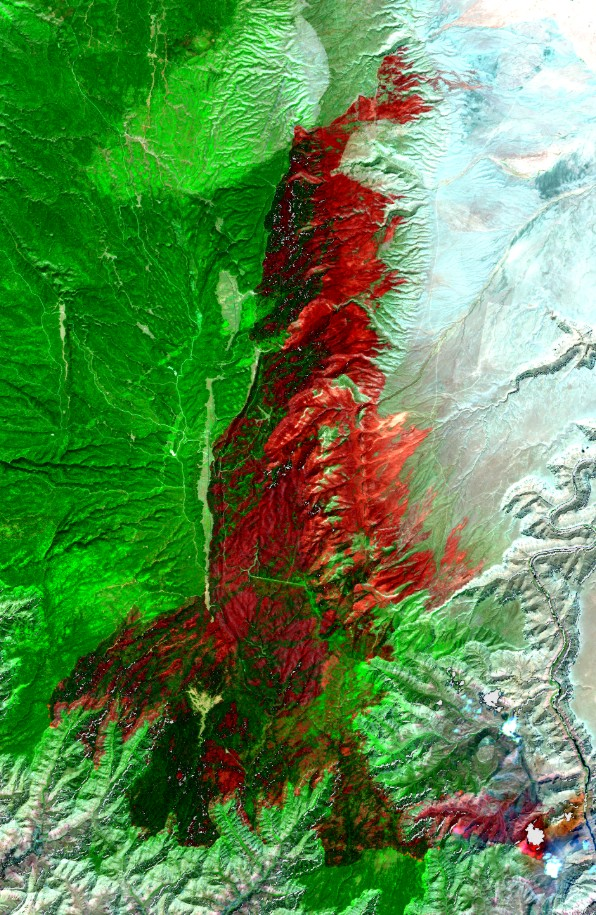
This Burned Area Reflectance Classification map shows the extent of forest vegetation burned in the 2025 Dragon Bravo Fire.

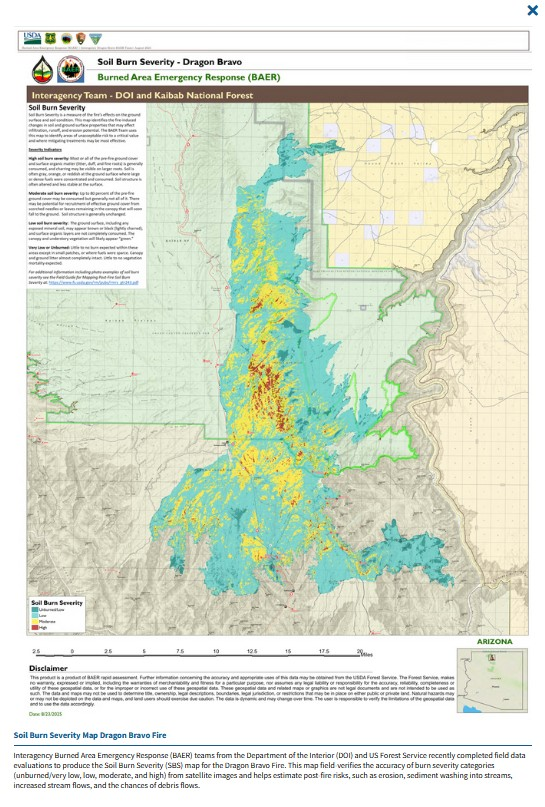
This is the Soil Burn Severity Map for the 2025 Dragon Bravo Fire.

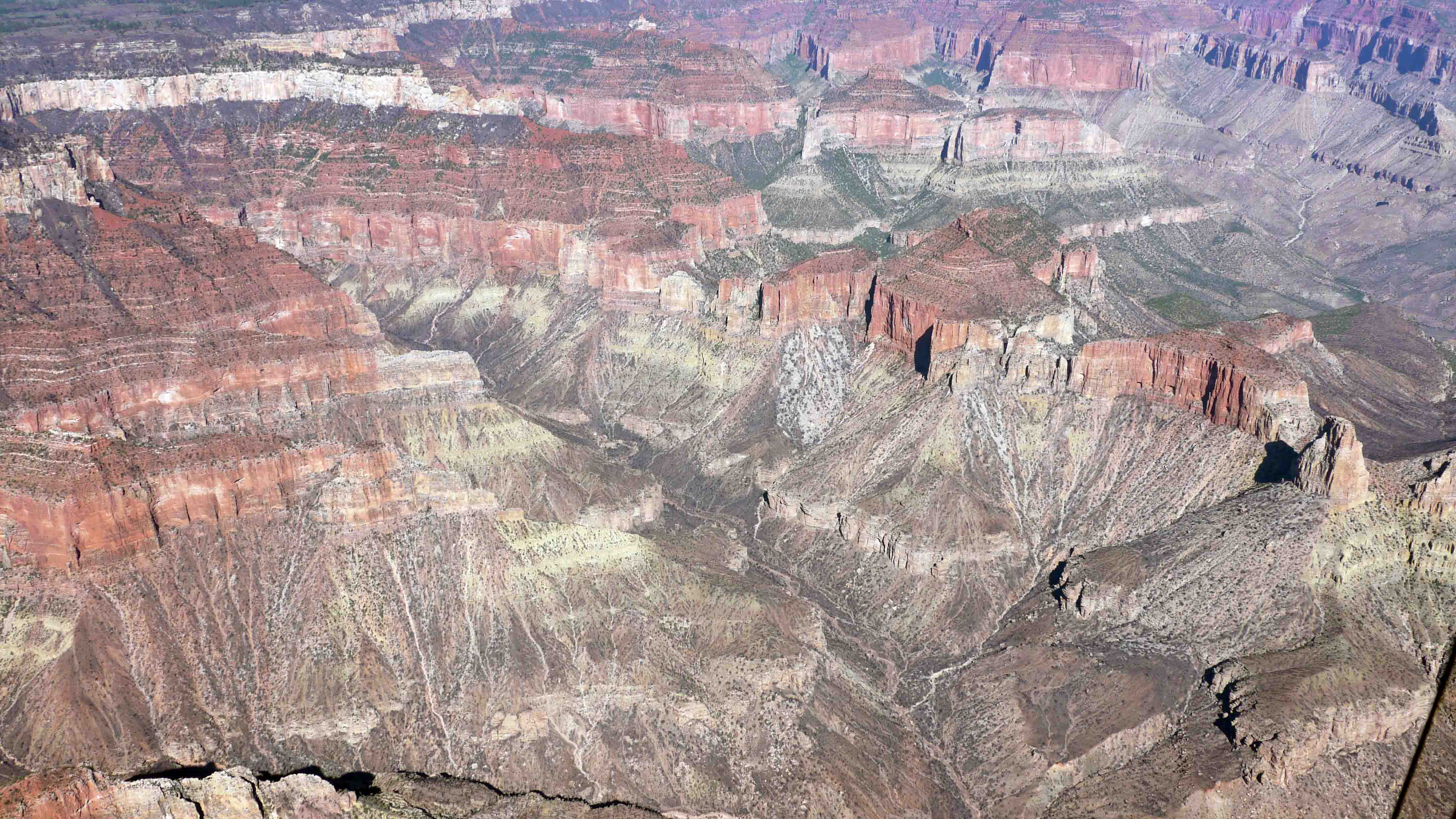
This view looks west into the Kwagunt Canyon basin.

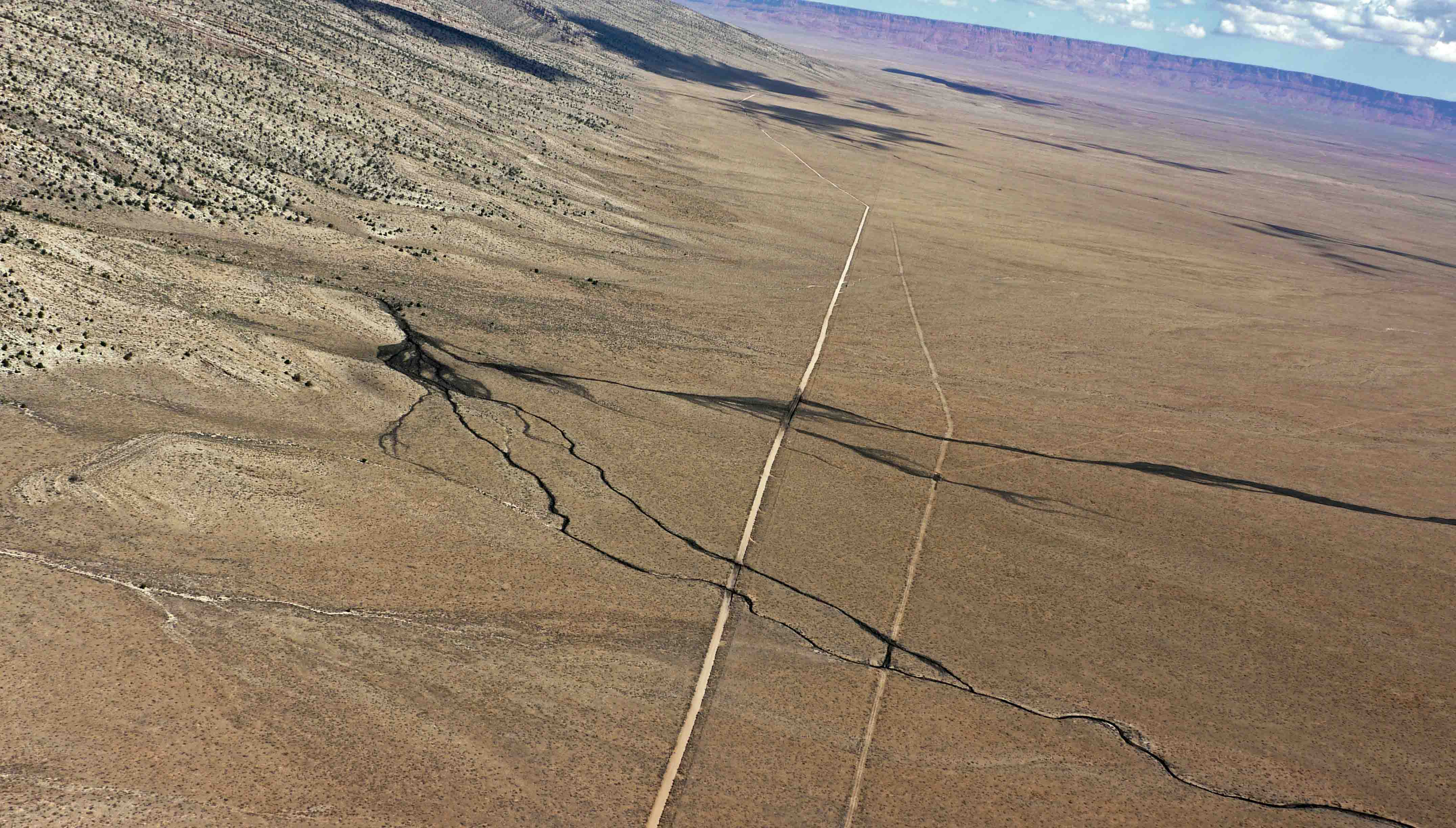
View north showing ash rich flooding crossing the House Rock Valley road.

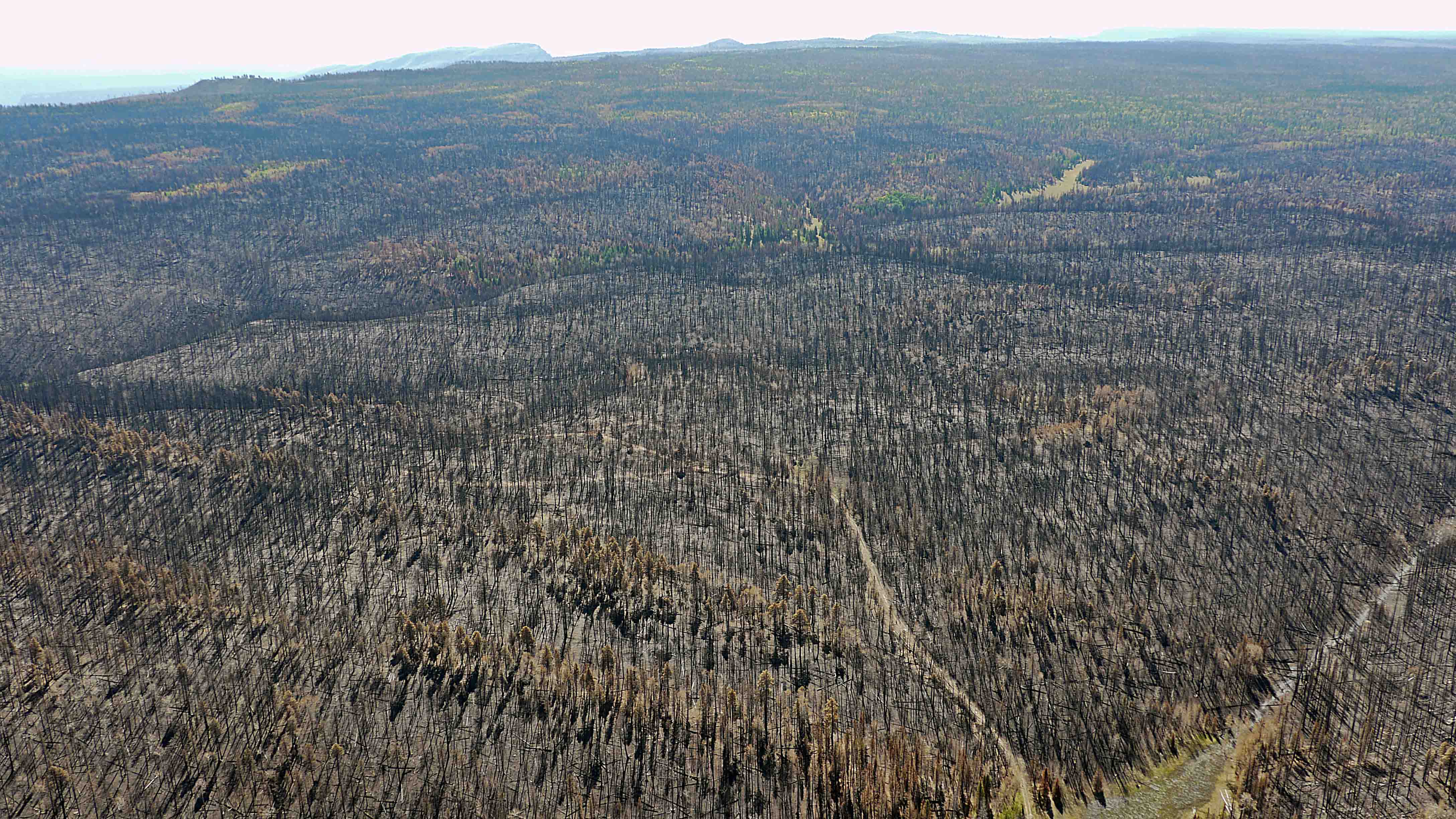
Stand replacing fire burned through this area of the Kaibab Plateau July 28, 2025.

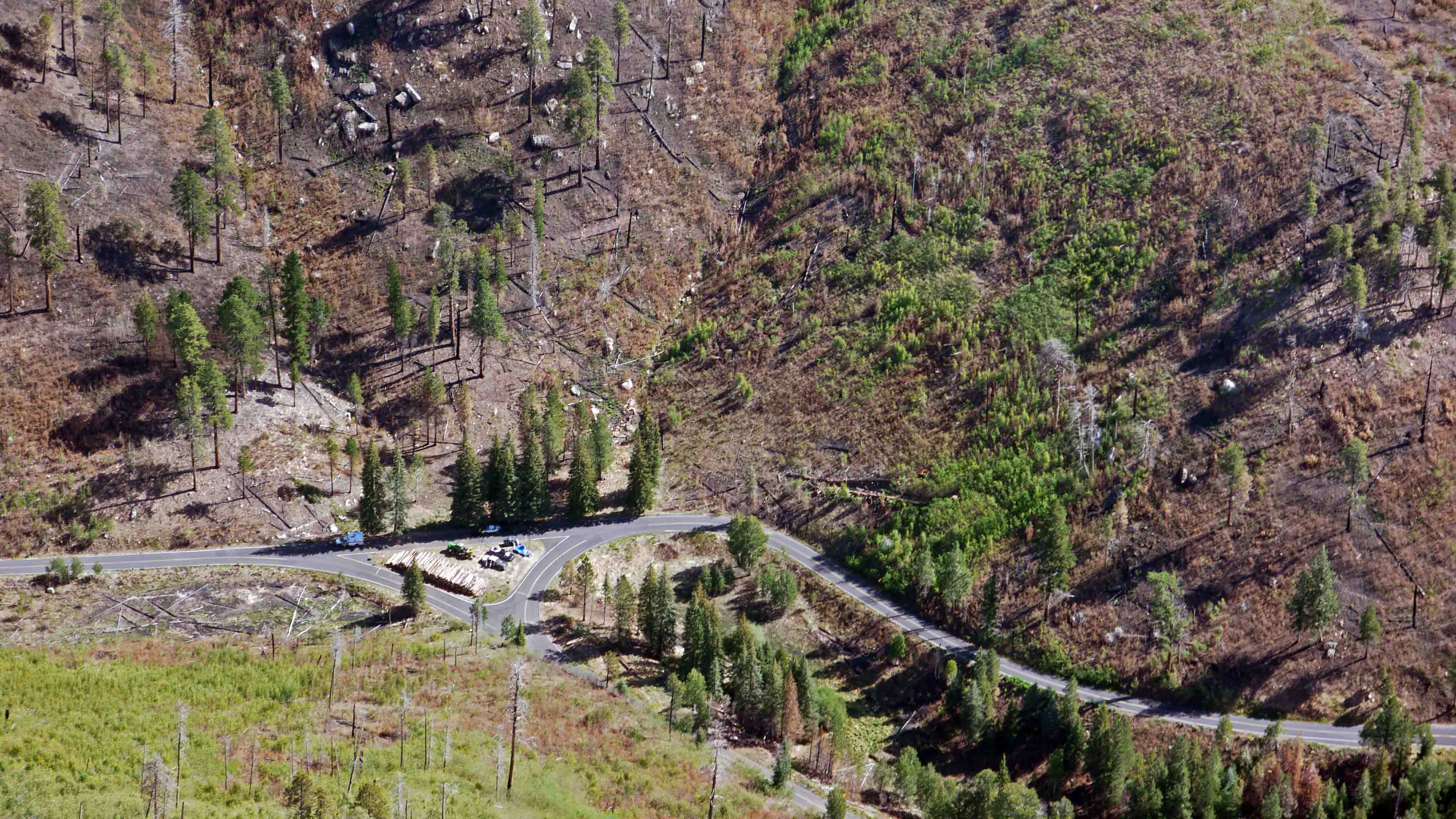
A pile of hazard trees ready to be removed from the Cape Royal Road in Grand Canyon National Park after the Dragon Bravo Fire.

=== July ===
July 4, 2025

A lightning caused fire on the North Rim of the Grand Canyon was first reported by a reconnaissance flight on July 4, 2025, at around 5:05 pm MST. The Williams Interagency Fire Dispatch Center assigns fires their names. A previous fire in the area in 2022 was called the Dragon Fire. This second fire was called Dragon B, hence Dragon Bravo. Estimated to be 0.25 acres in size and burning in a ponderosa pine stand, fire behavior consisted of smoldering and creeping through ground fuels with limited road access. Initial attack resources consisted of two engines and a Battalion Chief who responded promptly with the direction from the North Zone Duty Officer to utilize full suppression efforts. Later in the operational period and after discussions with the North Rim Manager, a decision was made to monitor the fire and employ a confine and contain strategy. This intent was relayed to the initial attack resources, and they suspended full suppression efforts. This decision was counter to National direction issued by the National Park Service Fire Director earlier in 2025 that stated fires were not to be managed for resource benefit during the 2025 fire season.

July 5-6, 2025

Initial attack resources returned to the ignition site to monitor the fire and assess conditions. No significant fire growth was reported as the fire was creeping and smoldering. Warming and drying trends continued, fire activity moderately increased and the fire grew to 9.7 acres. The first Wildland Fire Decision Support System decision for the Dragon Bravo Fire was published, documenting a confine and contain strategy. In this decision, it was reported, “Almost the entire planning area, 9,630 acres, is a proposed prescribed fire unit in FY28 (fall of 2027)”. The Superintendent of Grand Canyon National Park signed this decision as the Agency Administrator. Assigned resources continued monitoring the fire with no direct suppression actions taken. Fire behavior was meeting resource objectives and was reported to be creeping and backing with single tree torching.

July 7, 2025

The fire is reported at 10 acres in size and continued to grow gradually under warming, drying conditions. Two engines and one wildland fire module were ordered. Preparation began for containment lines along the W1 and W1C Roads and Widforss Trail.

July 9, 2025

The lightning caused White Sage Fire is first reported on Bureau of Land Management land roughly 50 miles northwest of the North Rim Developed Area.

July 10, 2025

The White Sage Fire greatly expands in size, closing Highway 89A north of Jacob Lake, Arizona. This prompts evacuation of the visitors at the North Rim Developed Area per the Coconino County Sheriff's Office. North Rim Developed Area Park staff and Lodge employees are told they must stay in place or they would not retain their jobs.

July 11, 2025

The Dragon Bravo Fire greatly expands. North Rim National Park Service employees and North Rim Lodge concessionaire employees are ordered to evacuate (At 1pm the employees were told that they were staying in place and the employee bar was opened then at 4:30pm the evacuation order was given). Later that night the fire burns into the North Rim Developed area, destroying the water treatment plant.

July 12, 2025

Chlorine gas cylinders stored at the waste water treatment plant begin to leak chlorine gas. The chlorine gas cylinders are used to chlorinate the water at Roaring Springs. This spring's water is used as the main water source for the North and South Rim Developed areas of the Park. Firefighters are temporarily evacuated from the North Rim, as are employees and guests at Phantom Ranch. This evacuation include construction crews near the Ranch working on the new water pipeline to the South Rim. River trips on the Colorado River in the Ranch are told to avoid stopping at the Bright Angel Boat Beach. Helicopters begin drawing water from the Colorado River below Horn Creek Rapid to use in fire suppression efforts at the North Rim Developed Area.

July 13, 2025

In the early hours of July 13, 2025, the historic Grand Canyon Lodge at the North Rim is destroyed by the fire. Dozens of other structures in the North Rim Developed area are also destroyed. Historic buildings destroyed include the Visitors Center and cabins associated with the Grand Canyon Inn and Campground, as well as the Grand Canyon North Rim Headquarters.

July 27–30, 2025

On July 27, the fire is now 50,323 acres (20,365 ha) in size. On July 28, the fire significantly increases in size and at the close of July 30, has more than doubled in size to 105,415 acres (42,660 ha), becoming a megafire. This three day advance burns through upper North Canyon, a refuge for Arizona's native fish Apache trout, and at one point threatened the Kaibab Lodge.

=== August ===
August 1, 2025

A localized Red flag warning was issued for the fires immediate area.

August 6, 2025

Besides the "developed area" including the historic North Rim Lodge, the following trails and areas had been burned: North Kaibab Trail down to Supai Tunnel; Both sides of Arizona State Route 67 (SR 67) from the Lodge to the park entrance gate; Both sides of the Cape Royal Road from SR 67 north to Point Imperial, and south to Roosevelt Point; Transept Trail (entirety); Widforss Trail (entirety); Tiyo Point Trail (entirety); Point Sublime Road on both sides from SR 67 to the Kanabowits Road, excluding The Basin meadow; the Ken Patrick Trail (entirety); Uncle Jim Loop Trail (entirety); Obi Point Trail; Old Bright Angel Trail; The Arizona Trail from the North Kaibab Trail trailhead to the north through the Park and beyond East Rim Viewpoint; A majority of the Kaibab National Forest east of SR 67 to the east end of the plateau including Upper North Canyon Trail (entirety); Upper South Canyon Trail (entirety); Upper Saddle Mountain trailhead, and some of the Saddle Mountain Trail; The East Rim Viewpoint and the Marble Viewpoint.

August 8, 2025

Another Red flag warning day occurred August 8, 2025, and the fire expanded 7,097 acres (2,872 ha) to the northeast, southwest, and southeast. The southeast expansion burned three miles to the east off the Walhalla Plateau down into the Grand Canyon proper.

August 12, 2025

The fire burned to within a mile of the Colorado River.

August 18, 2025

The fire passes the 145,000 acre mark or 227 square miles, an area equal to the size of Chicago, Illinois. At a community meeting held that evening in Fredonia, Arizona, Grand Canyon National Park Superintendent Ed Keable told the audience the fire was never a managed fire but was “a suppression fire from the beginning.” That statement didn't match Grand Canyon National Park's press releases about the fire's management under a confine and contain strategy during the first six days of the fire. Meeting attendees also learned that the North Rim Lodge concessionaire Aramark's employees still had no date certain to return to the North Rim Developed Area housing to gather up their personal belongings and vehicles left when the area was evacuated July 11, 2025.

August 19, 2025

Two Burned Area Emergency Response (BAER) Teams are ordered. The first is a two-agency Department of the Interior team assessing the fire on National Park Service and Bureau of Land Management lands, while the second BAER team mobilized through the Department of Agriculture to assess the fire on United States Forest Service lands. BAER identification involves the creation of maps for vegetation burn severity and soils burn severity, allowing identification of values at risk including rare and endangered species and flash flood hazards, including prescribing and conducting treatments to mitigate impacts.

August 31, 2025

Fire suppression costs reached $100,000,000.

=== September ===
September 8, 2025

70-year-old J. Hank Hester of Priest River, Idaho, a Firefighter/Equipment Operator, collapsed while performing suppression repair work at the Dragon Bravo Fire. Line paramedics performed CPR at the scene, but Hester could not be resuscitated. The suspected cause of death is a cardiovascular emergency.

=== November ===
November 1, 2025

Phantom Ranch reopened.

== Cause ==
The cause of the fire is believed to be due to lightning. Initially the fire was managed under a confine and contain strategy, which is intended to allow for the natural role of fire on the landscape while minimizing the risk to infrastructure and park values. Near record high temperatures, no precipitation, low fuel moistures and windy conditions all caused the fire to grow significantly in size.

== Growth and containment table ==
Fire containment status Gray: contained; Red: active; %: percent contained;
Date	Area burned	Personnel	Containment	Cost
Jul 4	0.25 acres (0 km^{2})	NA	0%	NA
Jul 5	NA	NA	0%	NA
Jul 6	2.75 acres (0 km^{2})	NA	0%	NA
Jul 7	22.4 acres (0 km^{2})	NA	0%	NA
Jul 8	22.4 acres (0 km^{2})	NA	0%	NA
Jul 9	59 acres (0 km^{2})	NA	0%	NA
Jul 10	120 acres (0 km^{2})	NA	0%	NA
Jul 11	1,500 acres (6 km^{2})	NA		NA
Jul 12	5,000 acres (20 km^{2})	NA		NA
Jul 13	5,717 acres (23 km^{2})	295		NA
Jul 14	8,570 acres (35 km^{2})	295		750K
Jul 15	9,289 acres (38 km^{2})	366		2.2M
Jul 16	11,012 acres (45 km^{2})	594		3.6M
Jul 17	11,742 acres (48 km^{2})	594		5.1M
Jul 18	11,742 acres (48 km^{2})	662		6.2M
Jul 19	12,645 acres (51 km^{2})	662		6.2M
Jul 20	12,728 acres (52 km^{2})	848		9.6M
Jul 21	13,662 acres (55 km^{2})	867		12.3M
Jul 22	16,765 acres (68 km^{2})	962		13.8M
Jul 23	23,082 acres (93 km^{2})	998		15.7M
Jul 24	28,773 acres (116 km^{2})	998		17.8M
Jul 25	35,456 acres (143 km^{2})	1,038		20.7M
Jul 26	44,429 acres (180 km^{2})	1,027		21.8M
Jul 27	50,393 acres (204 km^{2})	1,048		23.8M
Jul 28	71,005 acres (287 km^{2})	959		25.1M
Jul 29	94,228 acres (381 km^{2})	959		25.1M
Jul 30	105,415 acres (427 km^{2})	1,066		27.4M
Jul 31	111,907 acres (453 km^{2})	1,194		29.4M
Aug 1	114,538 acres (464 km^{2})	1,189		31.7M
Aug 2	116,592 acres (472 km^{2})	1,189		34.4M
Aug 3	123,171 acres (498 km^{2})	1,214		34.4M
Aug 4	126,445 acres (512 km^{2})	1,202		34.4M
Aug 5	130,520 acres (528 km^{2})	1,343		43.0M
Aug 6	132,309 acres (535 km^{2})	1,343		45.3M
Aug 7	134,050 acres (542 km^{2})	1,343		47.9M
Aug 8	141,147 acres (571 km^{2})	1,335		50.7M
Aug 9	143,489 acres (581 km^{2})	1,335		52.5M
Aug 10	143,808 acres (582 km^{2})	1,326		54.9M
Aug 11	143,974 acres (583 km^{2})	1,252		57.7M
Aug 12	144,432 acres (584 km^{2})	1,327		60.2M
Aug 13	144,984 acres (587 km^{2})	1,125		63.6M
Aug 14	144,984 acres (587 km^{2})	978		66.1M
Aug 15	144,984 acres (587 km^{2})	845		77.5M
Aug 16	144,984 acres (587 km^{2})	845		80.5M
Aug 17	144,984 acres (587 km^{2})	774		80.5M
Aug 18	144,991 acres (587 km^{2})	742		83.8M
Aug 19	145,489 acres (589 km^{2})	698		86.6M
Aug 20	145,498 acres (589 km^{2})	670		88.4M
Aug 21	145,500 acres (589 km^{2})	653		90.6M
Aug 22	145,500 acres (589 km^{2})	683		94.9M
Aug 24	145,504 acres (589 km^{2})	615		97.4M
Aug 25	145,504 acres (589 km^{2})	737		99.4M
Aug 26	145,504 acres (589 km^{2})	717		97.5M
Aug 27	145,504 acres (589 km^{2})	664		99.2M
Aug 28	145,504 acres (589 km^{2})	654		97.7M
Aug 29	145,504 acres (589 km^{2})	681		98.3M
Aug 30	145,504 acres (589 km^{2})	692		98.4M
Aug 31	145,504 acres (589 km^{2})	681		100M
Sep 1	145,504 acres (589 km^{2})	689		101.4M
Sep 2	145,504 acres (589 km^{2})	692		102.8M
Sep 3	145,504 acres (589 km^{2})	695		102.9M
Sep 4	145,504 acres (589 km^{2})	692		103.2M
Sep 11	145,504 acres (589 km^{2})	617		113.2M
Sep 19	145,504 acres (589 km^{2})	587		124M

== Impact ==
=== Closures and evacuations ===
On July 11, 2025, mandatory evacuation orders are issued for all North Rim residents.

On July 13, 2025, the North Rim of Grand Canyon National Park is closed for the remainder of the 2025 season and Arizona State Route 67 is closed due to the fire. Grand Canyon National Park closes the North and South Kaibab Trails as well as the Bright Angel Trail (except for river trip exchanges at the mouth of Pipe Creek). Phantom Ranch is evacuated and closed.

On July 14, 2025, U.S. Route 89A is closed from Fredonia to Cliff Dwellers Lodge due to the White Sage Fire. Additional closures in Grand Canyon National Park include the River Trail between Pipe Creek and the Kaibab Trail, the Tonto Trail between Havasupai Gardens and Tippoff, and all backcountry/canyoneering routes stemming from the North and South Kaibab or the Bright Angel trails.

On July 15, 2025, a Temporary Flight Restriction limits aircraft flights over the fire area to 13,000 feet (4,000 m) and higher.

On July 23, 2025, the entire North Kaibab Forest was closed.

On July 25, 2025, Highway U.S. Route 89A was reopened, removing the closure between Fredonia, Arizona and Cliff Dwellers Lodge.

On July 29, 2025, the fire swept off the high country and moved down the east Kaibab monocline into the House Rock Valley managed by the Bureau of Land Management. A closure was immediately imposed on the Valley.

On August 19, 2025, portions of the Kaibab National Forest are reopened. The closure of the House Rock Valley was also rescinded.

On August 20, 2025, portions of Grand Canyon National Park trails reopened. This includes the South Kaibab Trail from the Trailhead to Tipoff, the Tonto Trail from Tipoff to Havasupai Gardens, and the Bright Angel Trail from the Trailhead to Pipe Creek Resthouse.

On August 28, 2025, Arizona State Route 67 was opened from Jacob Lake to the Kaibab Lodge, located just north of the North Entrance station to Grand Canyon National Park.

On September 11, 2025, closures were lifted to another 96,000 acres (39,000 ha) of national forest lands on the North Kaibab Ranger District as the Forest Service further reduced the Dragon Bravo Fire Temporary Closure to lands within the burn area.

=== Criticism of response ===
The Arizona delegation including Governor Katie Hobbs, Senators Mark Kelly and Ruben Gallego, and Congressman Paul Gosar called for an investigation into the National Park Service handling of the fire. They criticized the federal government for initially managing the fire as a controlled burn.

Investigative reporters searched the Grand Canyon National Park Fire Management Plan and found that the plan has four criteria to allow a burn to proceed naturally. These criteria are temperature, humidity, wind speed, and wind gust. If these critical local thresholds are met, there is potential for a very bad fire.

Two days and five days after the fire was reported, these dangerous critical thresholds were approached. On July 10, three of the critical thresholds were exceeded; temperatures above 70 degrees, a humidity level below 15%, and wind gusts above 15 miles per hour, The fourth critical threshold, wind speed, was only two miles per hour short of meeting its target. On the 11th, the fire blew up. On the night of the 12th-13th, the entire North Rim Developed area burned, including the historic Lodge.

On Friday, August 22, 2025, banner headlines on the front page above the fold of Arizona's largest newspaper, the Arizona Republic, read WARNINGS IGNORED. The article stated National Park Service "officials downplayed threats to public safety -- and decided to let the fire burn for seven days -- even as fuel and weather conditions repeatedly reached the brink of critical thresholds for fire risk."

== See also ==
- 2025 United States wildfires
- 2025 Arizona wildfires
- List of Arizona wildfires
