= National Register of Historic Places listings in Grand Canyon National Park =

This is a list of the National Register of Historic Places listings in Grand Canyon National Park.

This is intended to be a complete list of the properties and districts on the National Register of Historic Places in Grand Canyon National Park, Arizona, United States. The locations of National Register properties and districts for which the latitude and longitude coordinates are included below, may be seen in a Google map.

There are 23 properties and districts listed on the National Register in the park, seven of which are National Historic Landmarks.

This National Park Service list is complete through NPS recent listings posted March 21, 2025.

== Current listings ==
	Name on the Register	Image	Date listed	Location	City or town	Description
1	1956 Grand Canyon TWA – United Airlines Aviation Accident Site	1956 Grand Canyon TWA – United Airlines Aviation Accident Site	April 22, 2014 (#14000280)	Near the confluence of the Colorado River and Little Colorado River; 36°10′30″N 111°50′00″W	Grand Canyon National Park	
2	Horace M. Albright Training Center	Horace M. Albright Training Center	September 13, 2013 (#13000784)	Albright Ave. & Center Rd. 35°58′41″N 111°59′26″W	Grand Canyon National Park	
3	Desert View Watchtower Historic District	Desert View Watchtower Historic District	January 3, 1995 (#94001503)	East Rim Drive, about 17 miles (27 km) east of Grand Canyon Village, Desert View; 36°02′42″N 111°49′34″W	Grand Canyon National Park	Desert View Watchtower, designed by Mary Jane Colter, part of the Mary Jane Colter NHL district
4	El Tovar Hotel	El Tovar Hotel	September 6, 1974 (#74000334)	Grand Canyon National Park, Route 8A; 36°03′27″N 112°08′13″W	Grand Canyon National Park	National Historic Landmark.hotel on the South Rim of the Grand Canyon
5	El Tovar Stables	El Tovar Stables	September 6, 1974 (#74000336)	Off Grand Canyon National Park Route 8A; 36°03′20″N 112°08′28″W	Grand Canyon National Park	Stables serving the mule trains that descend to the bottom of the Grand Canyon
6	Grand Canyon Inn and Campground	Grand Canyon Inn and Campground	September 2, 1982 (#82001872)	North Rim; 36°12′34″N 112°03′35″W	Grand Canyon National Park	Also known as the North Rim Inn, now a store about 1 mile north of the Grand Canyon Lodge
7	Grand Canyon Lodge	Grand Canyon Lodge	September 2, 1982 (#82001721)	North Rim on Bright Angel Point; 36°11′57″N 112°03′07″W	Grand Canyon National Park	National Historic Landmark lodge and cabins on the edge of the North Rim of the Grand Canyon
8	Grand Canyon North Rim Headquarters	Grand Canyon North Rim Headquarters	September 2, 1982 (#82001722)	North Rim; 36°12′53″N 112°03′42″W	Grand Canyon National Park	Park Service administrative district of rustic buildings
9	Grand Canyon Park Operations Building	Grand Canyon Park Operations Building	May 28, 1987 (#87001412)	Off West Rim Dr. 36°03′18″N 112°08′13″W	Grand Canyon National Park	National Historic Landmark, rustic park administration building
10	Grand Canyon Power House	Grand Canyon Power House	May 28, 1987 (#87001411)	Off West Rim Dr. 36°03′31″N 112°08′26″W	Grand Canyon National Park	National Historic Landmark, park power plant with creative use of scale and detailing
11	Grand Canyon Railroad Station	Grand Canyon Railroad Station	September 6, 1974 (#74000337)	Grand Canyon National Park Route 8A; 36°03′22″N 112°08′11″W	Grand Canyon National Park	National Historic Landmark, rustic terminus to the Grand Canyon Railway
12	Grand Canyon Railway	Grand Canyon Railway	August 23, 2000 (#00000319)	From Williams to Grand Canyon National Park; 35°35′59″N 112°12′44″W	Williams	Former branch of the Atchison, Topeka and Santa Fe Railway to the South Rim
13	Grand Canyon Village Historic District	Grand Canyon Village Historic District	November 20, 1975 (#75000343)	State Route 64; 36°03′22″N 112°08′21″W	Grand Canyon National Park	National Historic Landmark, the largest developed area in the national park system
14	Grandview Mine	Grandview Mine	July 9, 1974 (#74000347)	Grand Canyon National Park; 36°01′05″N 111°58′32″W	Grand Canyon National Park	Remnant of former mining activity
15	Hermits Rest Concession Building	Hermits Rest Concession Building	August 7, 1974 (#74000335)	Grand Canyon National Park; 36°03′40″N 112°12′40″W	Grand Canyon National Park	Rustic store and museum designed by Mary Jane Colter to resemble a Hopi pueblo
16	Mary Jane Colter Buildings	Mary Jane Colter Buildings	May 28, 1987 (#87001436)	Grand Canyon Village and East Rim Drive, about 17 miles (27 km) east of Grand Canyon Village, Desert View; 36°03′29″N 112°08′13″W	Grand Canyon National Park	Four National Historic Landmark properties: Hopi House, Desert View Watchtower, Lookout Studio, Hermit's Rest
17	Navajo Steel Arch Highway Bridge	Navajo Steel Arch Highway Bridge	August 13, 1981 (#81000134)	Southwest of Lee; 36°49′05″N 111°37′52″W	Lee's Ferry	Highway bridge over the upper Grand Canyon
18	Buckey O'Neill Cabin	Buckey O'Neill Cabin	October 29, 1975 (#75000227)	Off State Route 64 in Grand Canyon National Park; 36°03′26″N 112°08′26″W	Grand Canyon National Park	Part of the Bright Angel Lodge, the cabin perches right on the rim of the canyon
19	Ranger's Dormitory	Ranger's Dormitory	September 5, 1975 (#75000219)	Off State Route 64 in Grand Canyon National Park; 36°03′20″N 112°08′11″W	Grand Canyon National Park	Rustic Park Service employee housing
20	Superintendent's Residence	Superintendent's Residence	September 6, 1974 (#74000450)	Off Route 8A in Grand Canyon National Park; 36°03′22″N 112°08′05″W	Grand Canyon National Park	Highly-detailed National Park Service Rustic structure
21	Trans-Canyon Telephone Line, Grand Canyon National Park	Trans-Canyon Telephone Line, Grand Canyon National Park	May 13, 1986 (#86001102)	Grand Canyon along the Bright Angel and North Kaibab Trails from the South Rim to Roaring Springs and the South Kaibab Trail to Tipoff; 36°06′36″N 112°05′34″W	Grand Canyon National Park	Innovative communication line between the North and South Rims
22	Tusayan Ruins	Tusayan Ruins	July 10, 1974 (#74000285)	Grand Canyon National Park; 36°00′49″N 111°51′56″W	Grand Canyon National Park	Pueblo culture ruins and museum
23	Water Reclamation Plant	Water Reclamation Plant	September 6, 1974 (#74000348)	South of Grand Canyon National Park, Route 8A; 36°02′54″N 112°09′19″W	Grand Canyon National Park	Innovative water treatment system, one of the first of its kind

== See also ==
- National Register of Historic Places listings in Coconino County, Arizona
- List of National Historic Landmarks in Arizona
- National Register of Historic Places listings in Arizona
