= North Rim (disambiguation) =

North Rim is an area located on the Kaibab Plateau and Walhalla Plateau within Grand Canyon National Park in Arizona, U.S.

North Rim may also refer to:

- North Rim Headquarters District, also known as the Grand Canyon North Rim Headquarters, a historic district
- North Rim Inn, formally known as the Grand Canyon Inn and Campground, a historic building

== See also ==
- North Rim Road, Black Canyon of the Gunnison National Park, in Colorado, U.S.
- South Rim, located across the Grand Canyon from the North Rim area
