= Jacob Lake =

Jacob Lake may refer to:

- Jacob Lake, Arizona, an unincorporated community
- Jacobs Lake (St. Louis County, Minnesota), a lake
