= House Rock, Arizona =

Ghost town in Coconino County

- Ghost town
- Location within Arizona Location within the United States
- Coordinates: 36°43′53″N 112°02′49″W
- Country: United States
- State: Arizona
- County: Coconino
- Elevation: 5,390 ft (1,640 m)
- Time zone: UTC-7 (MST (no DST))
- ZIP code: 86036
- Area code: 928
- GNIS feature ID: 6055

House Rock is a ghost town near the northwest end of the House Rock Valley in northern Coconino County, Arizona, United States. The community was named after the House Rock Valley, which was named by the John Wesley Powell Expedition in 1871. (However, the site where the expedition spent the night and the community are on the opposite ends of the valley.)

== Description ==
The mostly abandoned locale is just east of the Kaibab National Forest and the mouth of House Rock Canyon at the southwest corner of, but just outside of, the Vermilion Cliffs National Monument (which was established in 2000). House Rock is located along what was, prior to 1960, U.S. Route 89 (US 89), but is now U.S. Route 89A (US 89A). Little remains of the community, other than a few houses and a small cemetery, but the site is an important road junction for access to the nearby national monument, being the southern terminus of House Rock Road (BLM Road 1065). Since the monument is surrounded on the north, east, and south sides by the Paria Canyon-Vermilion Cliffs Wilderness Area, the only possible road access is from the west. House Rock Road runs (for about 30 miles [48 km]) along the western edge of the monument, north from House Rock, through the length of the Coyote Valley, to end at US‑89 at the southern end of Five Mile Valley in Kane County, Utah. (The northernmost 9 miles [14 km] of the road, north of the Utah State line, the road is also known as House Rock Valley Road.)

== History ==
Not much information is available regarding specific history of House Rock, but it did begin appear on maps produced by the United States Geological Survey as early as 1936. With the construction of US 89 in the early 20th century, it would likely have been a somewhat significant location, since the nearest communities along US 89 were Jacob Lake (about 14 miles [23 km] to the west) and Cliff Dwellers Lodge (about 20 miles [32 km] to the east) – that later community of which is sometimes confused with House Rock.

== In popular culture ==
One of the houses in House Rock was featured in the February 2014 edition of Arizona Highways.

== See also ==
- List of ghost towns in Arizona
