= Grand Canyon Inn and Campground =

- U.S. National Register of Historic Places
- U.S. Historic district
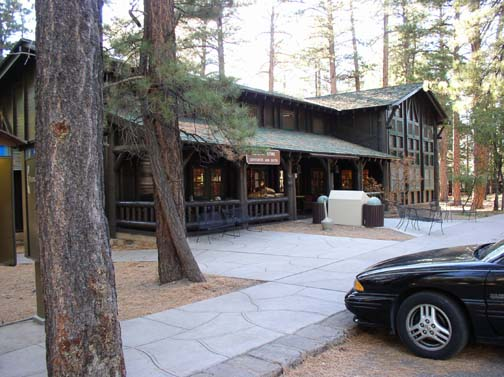
- North Rim Inn

- Location within Arizona Location within the United States
- Location: North Rim, Grand Canyon National Park, Arizona
- Coordinates: 36°12′36.7″N 112°03′38.2″W
- Area: 77 acres (31 ha)
- Built: 1928
- Architect: Utah Parks Co., Gilbert Stanley Underwood
- Architectural style: Rustic
- NRHP reference No.: 82001872
- Added to NRHP: September 2, 1982

The Grand Canyon Inn and Campground, also known as the North Rim Inn, were built by the William W. Wylie and the Utah Parks Company as inexpensive tourist accommodations on the North Rim of the Grand Canyon, in Grand Canyon National Park. Intended to complement the more expensive Grand Canyon Lodge, the cabins and Inn were located near Bright Angel Point, but father back than their more expensive counterparts, near the Grand Canyon North Rim Headquarters. The design of the cabins and the redesign of the Inn building were undertaken by architect Gilbert Stanley Underwood.

== History ==
William Wylie, was an established concessioner in Yellowstone National Park, where he established Wylie's Tent Camps to service automobile-borne tourists. In 1916 Wylie established a similar tent camp, the Wylie Way Camp, at Bright Angel Point with ten sleeping tents and a dining tent, operating in summer months. In 1924 management of the camp was taken over by Wylie's daughter Elizabeth and her husband Thomas H. McKee. Two years later they began building permanent frame cabins, culminating in 38 frame cabins, 16 tented cabins, a central pavilion, utility buildings and a power plant before they were bought out by the Utah Parks Company.

The Utah Parks Company was a subsidiary of the Union Pacific Railroad, established to feed tourist traffic into the railroad's network in the southwestern United States. The Utah Parks Company operated lodges in Zion and Bryce Canyon national parks and at Cedar Breaks National Monument. The company assigned their company architect, Gilbert Stanley Underwood, to design a new lodge on Bright Angel Point at the edge of the canyon. The Wylie camp was rebuilt under Underwood's guidance in 1929 with a new central lodge with a rustic design and new cabins identical to those offered at the main lodge. A National Park Service-operated campground was established nearby, with rustic bathhouses and an amphitheater.

Located about 1 mile (1.6 km) back from Bright Angel Point, the Inn's accommodations were less desirable than the Lodge's, which were almost on the edge of the precipice. The Inn building became a dining facility, then a store. The former tourist cabins became Park Service and concessioner personnel housing.

== Description ==
The Grand Canyon Inn building is a single-story structure measuring about 73.5 feet (22.4 m) by 41.85 feet (12.76 m) with irregular extensions to the rear and a smaller projection to the front. The rustic building is a "studs-out" structure with the sheathing on the inside of the exposed structural framing. The corners are marked by peeled log posts, similar to those supporting the large porch across the building's front, which has been enclosed. The building features clerestory windows between the porch roof and the main roof.

Four studs-out duplex cabins are located to the rear of the Inn. These gabled cabins were built in 1934, with an interior renovation in 1961. The duplexes are T-shaped with individual toilets adjoining in an extension. Ten more duplex cabins, built with shared toilets, are log cabins with stone front porches. They are identical to the Grand Canyon Lodge's "regular," "economy," or "standard" cabins. Another 27 cabins are exposed-frame single-family cabins. Other structures include the laundry and the firehouse, as well as a washhouse or former dormitory and a linen house.

The North Rim Campground lies just to the south of the Inn. The campground's log restrooms and stone firewood enclosures are included in the historic district for their historical integrity and architectural character.

The former Inn, cabins and campground were placed on the National Register of Historic Places on September 2, 1982.

The fate of buildings in and around the campground during the Dragon Bravo Fire of July 2025, which destroyed an estimated 50 to 80 buildings in the area including the main building of the Grand Canyon Lodge, was not immediately known.
