= Arizona State Route 67 =

State highway in Arizona, United States

State Route 67
- Kaibab Plateau – North Rim Parkway
- SR 67 highlighted in red

Route information
- Maintained by ADOT and NPS
- Length: 43.4 mi (69.8 km)
- Existed: 1941–present
- Tourist routes: Kaibab Plateau–North Rim Parkway
- Restrictions: Closed winters

Major junctions
- South end: Bright Angel Point south of North Rim
- North end: US 89A near Jacob Lake

Location
- Country: United States
- State: Arizona

Highway system
- Arizona State Highway System; Interstate; US; State; Scenic Proposed; Former
← SR 66	→ SR 68

State Route 67 (SR 67) is a 43.4-mile-long (69.8 km), north–south state highway in northern Arizona. Also called the Kaibab Plateau – North Rim Parkway, SR 67 is the sole road that links U.S. Route 89A (US 89A) at Jacob Lake to the North Rim of Grand Canyon National Park. Along the route, the road heads through the national park as well as Kaibab National Forest and traverses extensive coniferous forests. The section inside the national park is maintained by the National Park Service (NPS), whereas the section north of the entrance, completely within Kaibab National Forest, is owned by the Arizona Department of Transportation (ADOT). The road was built in the late 1920s and improved through the 1930s. In 1941, the road received its number, and was given its designation as the parkway in the 1980s. The parkway has received designations as a National Forest Scenic Byway as well as a National Scenic Byway.

== Route description ==
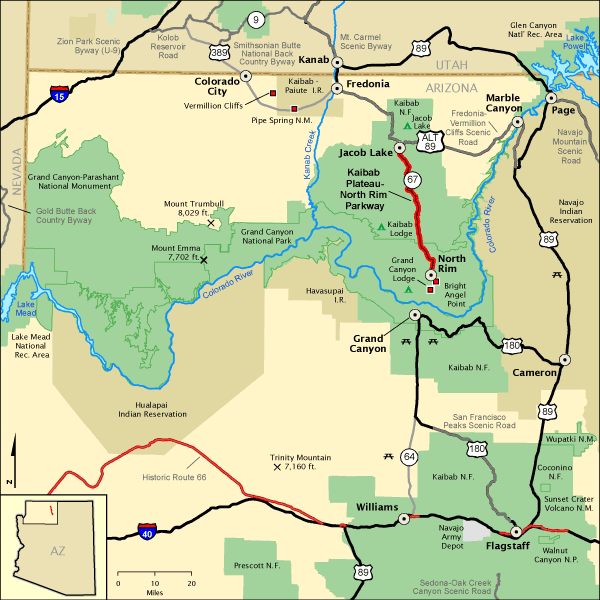
Map of the Kaibab Plateau-North Rim Parkway

Signage for SR 67 begins near the Grand Canyon Lodge and Bright Angel Point Trail, a paved trail that provides access to Bright Angel Point, along the North Rim of Grand Canyon National Park. ADOT does not officially own this section of road, but it is signed as SR 67.

The road heads north as the Kaibab Plateau–North Rim Parkway through the small town of North Rim, surrounded by evergreen trees. The parkway enters a small clearing before meeting the park entrance, where ownership by ADOT begins. Heading into Kaibab National Forest on a northward path, the roadway is surrounded by a narrow meadow bordered by evergreen trees. As it passes the nearby Deer Lake, SR 67 meets an unpaved National Forest road. The landscape around the route is crisscrossed by these routes as SR 67 makes several turns, turning back toward the north. The highway, with the new name of Grand Canyon Highway in addition to its other designation, makes several turns as it heads north through the woods. It takes a more northwesterly path as it runs through Coconino County. Near its terminus, the road turns back northeast toward its terminus at US 89A in Jacob Lake.

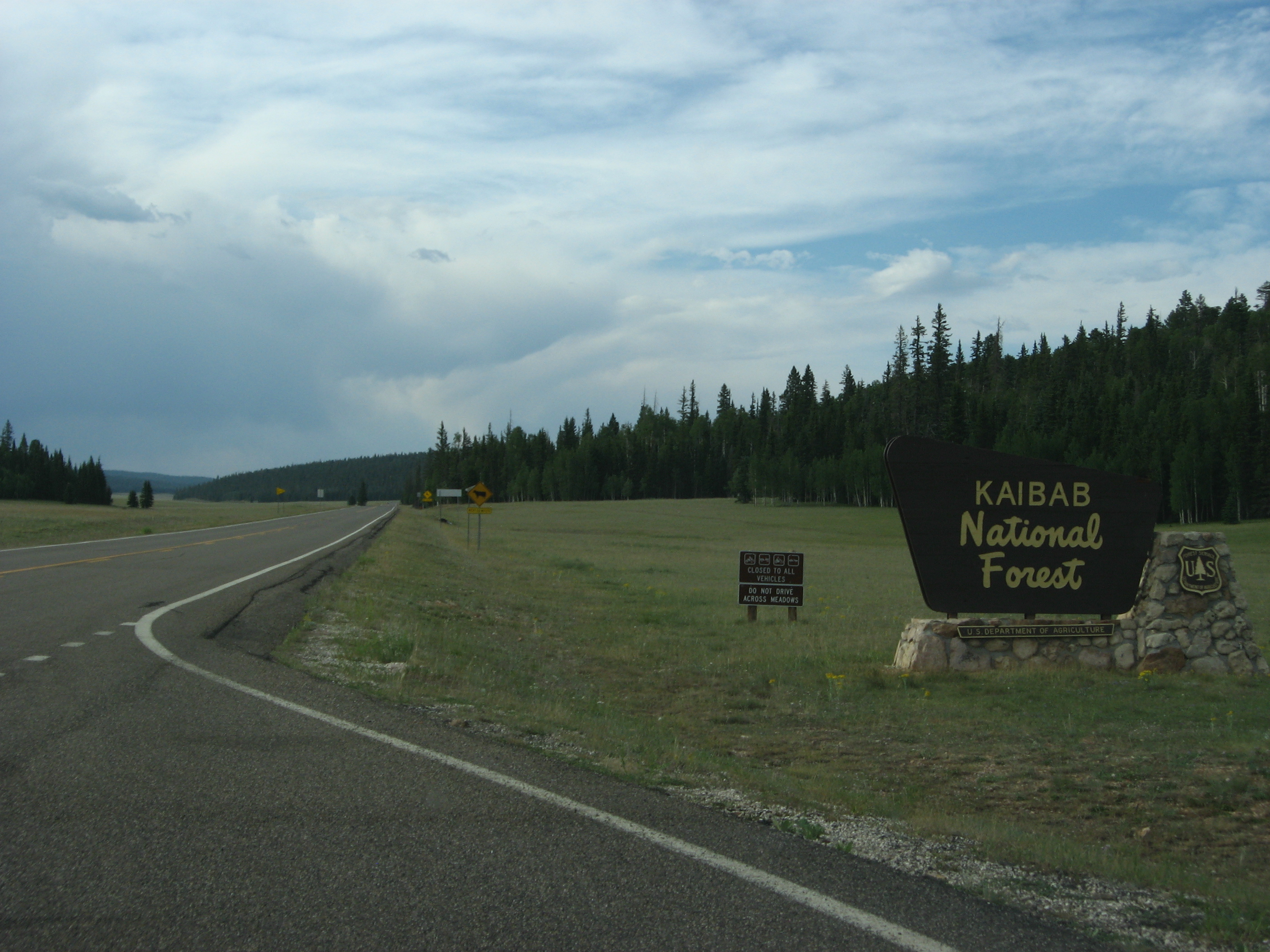
SR 67 at the Kaibab National Forest entrance

The northern segment of the highway is maintained by ADOT, who is responsible for maintaining SR 67 like all other highways around the state. As part of this job, ADOT periodically surveys traffic along its routes. These surveys are most often presented in the form of average annual daily traffic, which is the number of vehicles who use the route on any average day during the year. In 2009, ADOT calculated that around 1,100 vehicles used the route daily at its northern terminus in Jacob Lake. The Federal Highway Administration (FHWA) lists the highway as a National Scenic Byway, and the National Forest Service has also designated it a National Forest Service Byway. No part of the highway has been listed in the National Highway System, a system of roads in the United States important to the nation's economy, defense, and mobility. Due to the closure of park facilities on the north rim of the Grand Canyon during winter, winter maintenance is not undertaken after December 1, with the result that SR 67 is usually closed to vehicular traffic from December 1 until spring.

== History ==
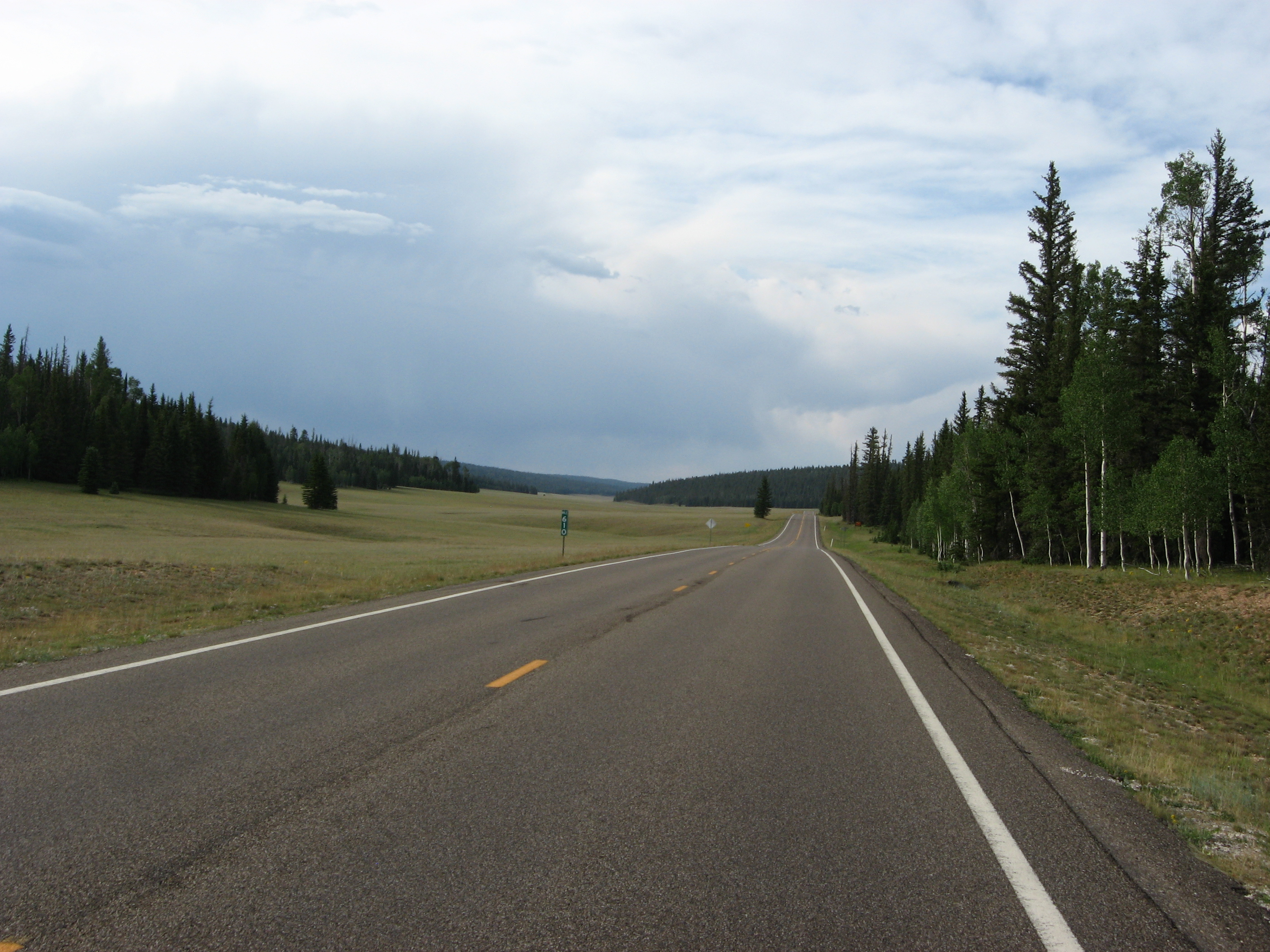
SR 67 in Kaibab National Forest

SR 67 existed as a route to reach the north rim of the Grand Canyon National Park as early as 1927 as a dirt road. By 1935, the road had been improved to a gravel road, and by 1938 it had been paved. In 1941, the road was designated as a state highway and signed as SR 67. In 1985, the highway received the designation of Kaibab Plateau – North Rim Parkway as an Arizona State Scenic Byway. The designation included SR 67 in its entirety as well as extending south into Grand Canyon National Park. Two years later, ADOT obtained the right-of-way for improvement of the highway from its northern terminus approximately 10 miles (16 km) south. In 1989, an additional right-of-way was acquired by ADOT from its southern terminus approximately 5 miles (8.0 km) north. By June of that year, the parkway received the designation of a National Forest Scenic Byway, and in June 1998, the Kaibab Plateau – North Rim Parkway received another designation, this time as a National Scenic Byway. Since establishment, the route has not been realigned and retains its original routing.

== Junction list ==
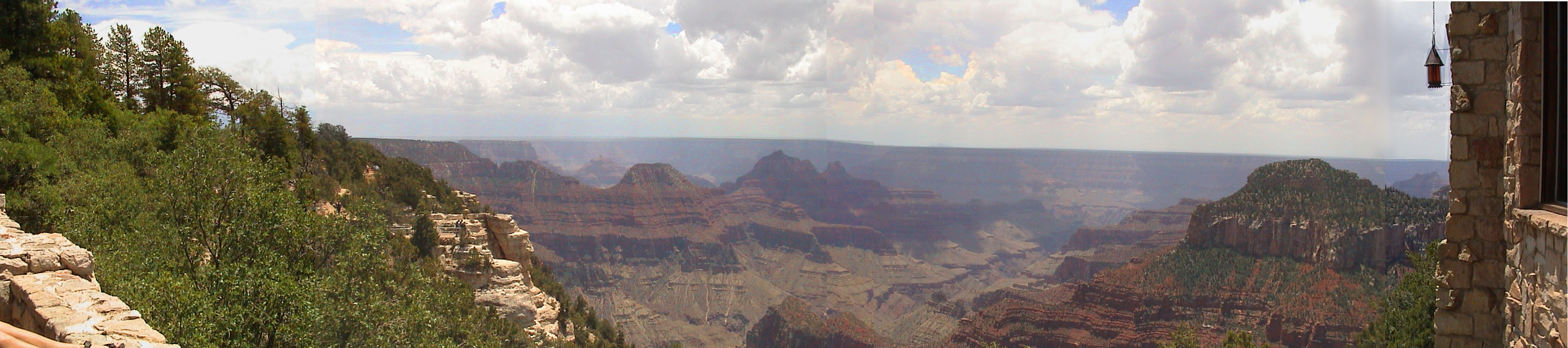
View of the Grand Canyon from Grand Canyon Lodge near Bright Angel Point

The entire route is in Coconino County.

Location	mi	km	Destinations	Notes
Grand Canyon NP	43.4	69.8	Bright Angel Point	Southern terminus
Grand Canyon NP	30.81	49.58	North entrance station	ADOT ownership begins
Jacob Lake	0.00	0.00	US 89A – Fredonia, Flagstaff	Northern terminus
1.000 mi = 1.609 km; 1.000 km = 0.621 mi: Tolled
