= House Rock Valley =

Valley in Coconino County, Arizona, United States

- Location within Arizona Location within the United States
- Floor elevation: 3,182 feet (970 m)

Geography
- Country: United States
- State: Arizona
- County: Yavapai
- Unincorporated community: House Rock
- Coordinates: 36°40′24″N 111°44′41″W
- Traversed by: U.S. Route 89A
- River: House Rock Wash
- Interactive map of House Rock Valley

House Rock Valley is a valley south of Paria Plateau and the Vermilion Cliffs, east of Kaibab Plateau, and west of the Colorado River as it flows through Marble Canyon, in Coconino County, Arizona, United States. The valley was named by the John Wesley Powell Expedition after a rock formation in the valley where they spent the night in 1871. The coordinates given are for the mouth of House Rock Wash which drains much of House Rock Valley into the Colorado River. The valley is traversed by U.S. Route 89A.

== See also ==
- List of valleys of Arizona
