= Grand Canyon North Rim Headquarters =

- U.S. National Register of Historic Places
- U.S. Historic district
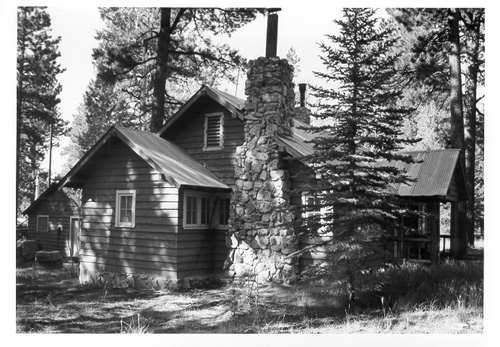
- North Rim ranger residence

- Location within Arizona Location within the United States
- Location: North Rim, Grand Canyon, Arizona
- Coordinates: 36°12′53″N 112°3′42″W
- Built: 1926
- Architect: National Park Service; Civilian Conservation Corps
- Architectural style: Rustic
- NRHP reference No.: 82001722
- Added to NRHP: September 2, 1982

The Grand Canyon North Rim Headquarters is a historic district on the North Rim of the Grand Canyon in Grand Canyon National Park, Arizona. Established from 1926 through the 1930s, the district includes examples of rustic architecture as applied to employee residences, administrative facilities and service structures.

== History ==
The North Rim experienced very little development until 1926, in part due to the intervention of Senator Ralph Cameron, who held commercial interests in the park area prior to its establishment, and who prevented funding of North Rim improvements.

Starting in 1926, the first structures included the Ranger Residence and the accompanying wood shed and horse barn. Additional structures were added during the late 1920s and 1930s, including various equipment storage areas, warehouses, and residences. The last structure to be constructed as part of the North Rim Headquarters was an equipment shed in 1936.

Over the years, the use of these buildings has changed considerably, however, in most instances, these changes do not affect the exterior of the structure. The most significant architectural qualities are limited to the exterior facades, the fireplace in Residence No. 102, and to the wrought iron door hinges on several of the maintenance buildings.

The fate of buildings in the North Rim Headquarters district during the Dragon Bravo Fire of July 2025, which destroyed an estimated 50 to 80 buildings in the area including the main building of the Grand Canyon Lodge, was not immediately known.

== Description ==
The district comprises two sections, each with residences. The eastern portion includes a garage and a ranger station, while the western group includes an office, a barn and maintenance buildings.

The oldest structure, a residence, is a one-story gable-roofed structure, built in frame on a stone foundation with lap siding in 1926. Other houses, sheds and a dormitory were built in 1931. The dormitory is particularly notable for its expression of the rustic style. A ranger station, also known as the old administration building, was built in 1931 and moved in the mid-1930s, but was destroyed by fire on March 5, 1982.

Other buildings include a machine shop (1932), gas and oil station (1933) and a variety of residences.

== Historic designation ==
The Grand Canyon North Rim Headquarters District was placed on the National Register of Historic Places on September 2, 1982.

== See also ==
- North Rim of the Grand Canyon
- Architects of the National Park Service
- Buildings and structures in Grand Canyon National Park
- National Register of Historic Places listings in Grand Canyon National Park
