= Grand Canyon Lodge =

NRPH building in Coconino County, Arizona

- U.S. National Register of Historic Places
- U.S. National Historic Landmark District
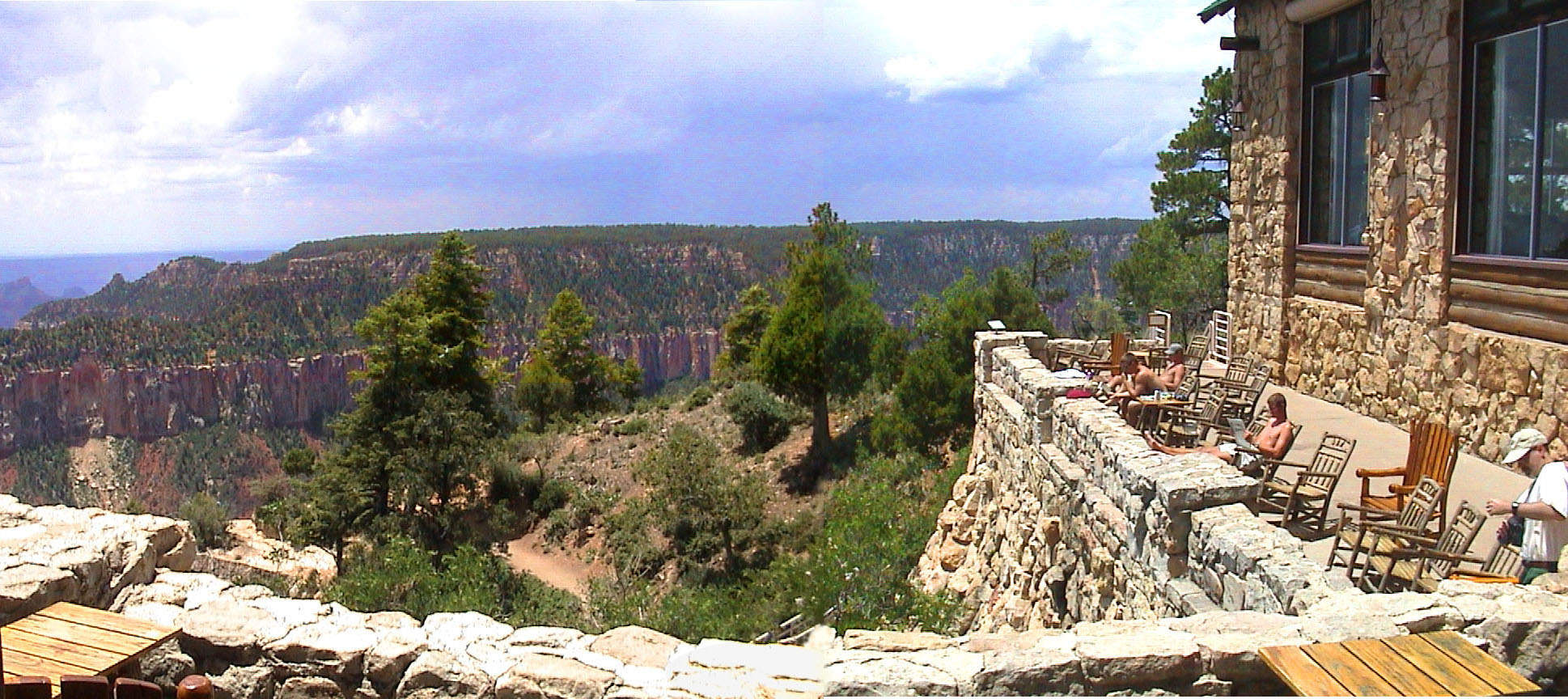
- View of the Grand Canyon from the Lodge

- Location within Arizona Location within the United States

- Location: Bright Angel Point, North Rim, Grand Canyon National Park, Arizona
- Coordinates: 36°11′50″N 112°03′12″W
- Built: 1927; 99 years ago
- Architect: Gilbert S. Underwood
- Website: grandcanyonnorth.com
- NRHP reference No.: 82001721

Significant dates
- First fire: September 1, 1932; 94 years ago
- Reconstructed: 1936–1937; 89 years ago
- Second fire: July 13, 2025; 13 months ago
- Added to NRHP: September 2, 1982
- Designated NHLD: May 28, 1987

The Grand Canyon Lodge was a hotel and cabins complex at Bright Angel Point on the North Rim of the Grand Canyon, built in 1927–1928. The Grand Canyon Lodge resort complex consisted of the main lodge building, 23 deluxe cabins, and 91 standard cabins, some of which were moved to the north rim campground in 1940. All guests were housed in cabins detached from the main lodge, which served as a dining, concessions, and service facility. The facility was added to the National Register of Historic Places in 1982.

The lodge was designed by Gilbert Stanley Underwood, who designed a number of other hotels in national parks for the Utah Parks Company and other concessioners. The complex was constructed of native Kaibab Limestone and timber and was designed to harmonize with its rocky and forested setting. It was notable for its setting and rustic design, and for being the last complete lodge and cabin complex in the national parks of the United States.

The main lodge has been destroyed by fire twice in its history, the first time in 1932 and the second in 2025.

== History ==
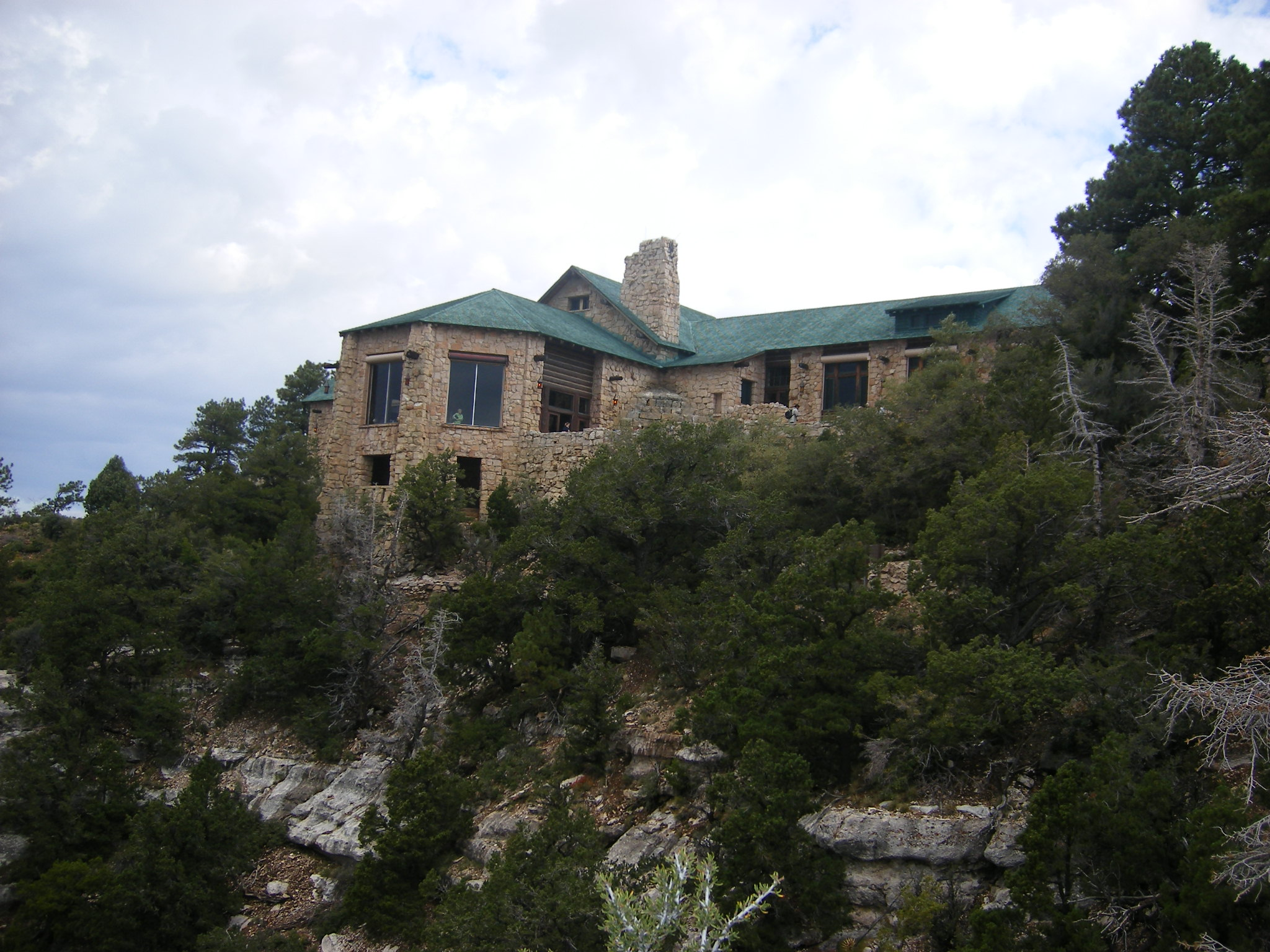
A view of the Main Lodge from below, in 2006

A new hotel complex was built on the North Rim in 1927–28 by the Utah Parks Company, a subsidiary of the Union Pacific Railroad which operated similar concessions in Zion and Bryce Canyon National Parks. Until then, most of the concession activity on the North Rim was at the camp run by W. W. Wylie, a concessioner more closely associated with Yellowstone National Park who operated the tent camp; the camp became the Grand Canyon Inn and Campground after it was taken over by the Utah Parks Company.

The Grand Canyon Lodge initially consisted of the Main Lodge building, 20 deluxe cabins, and 100 standard cabins. Twenty additional cabins were constructed in 1928. The lodge and many of the cabins were built in the fall and winter of 1927–28, in a region known for its severe winter weather. Cabin construction continued through the summer of 1928.

=== 1932 fire ===
On September 1, 1932, an early-morning fire destroyed much of the main lodge, which housed 25 girls sleeping in a dormitory area, and two cabins, which were vacant. The blaze was believed to have begun in the kitchen around 5:30 a.m. and engulfed the lodge within 30 minutes; no injuries were reported. The loss was estimated at $2 million ($47.2 million in 2025).

Plans were announced in January 1936 to rebuild the lodge with an estimated cost of $250,000 ($5.8 million in 2025). A temporary hotel was constructed approximately one-half mile (0.80 km) from the original lodge, but it also was destroyed by fire in September 1936.

The lodge was rebuilt during 1936–37 to a modified design that reused much of the original stonework, but it was scaled back, (Note: This rebuild occurred during the Great Depression of 1929–1939.) lacking the original's second story and observation tower. It was open to guests by early June 1937. Underwood increased the amount of stonework and modified the roofline in response to the original lodge's experience of heavy snowfall. Debate continues over the role that Underwood played in the rebuilt Grand Canyon Lodge, as he was working for the federal government by that time, and his signature is not apparent on the reconstruction drawings.

=== Historic recognition ===
The Grand Canyon Lodge was placed on the National Register of Historic Places on September 2, 1982. The historic district includes a rustic drinking fountain and a trail shelter near the head of the North Kaibab Trail. It was declared a National Historic Landmark on May 28, 1987.

=== 2025 fire ===
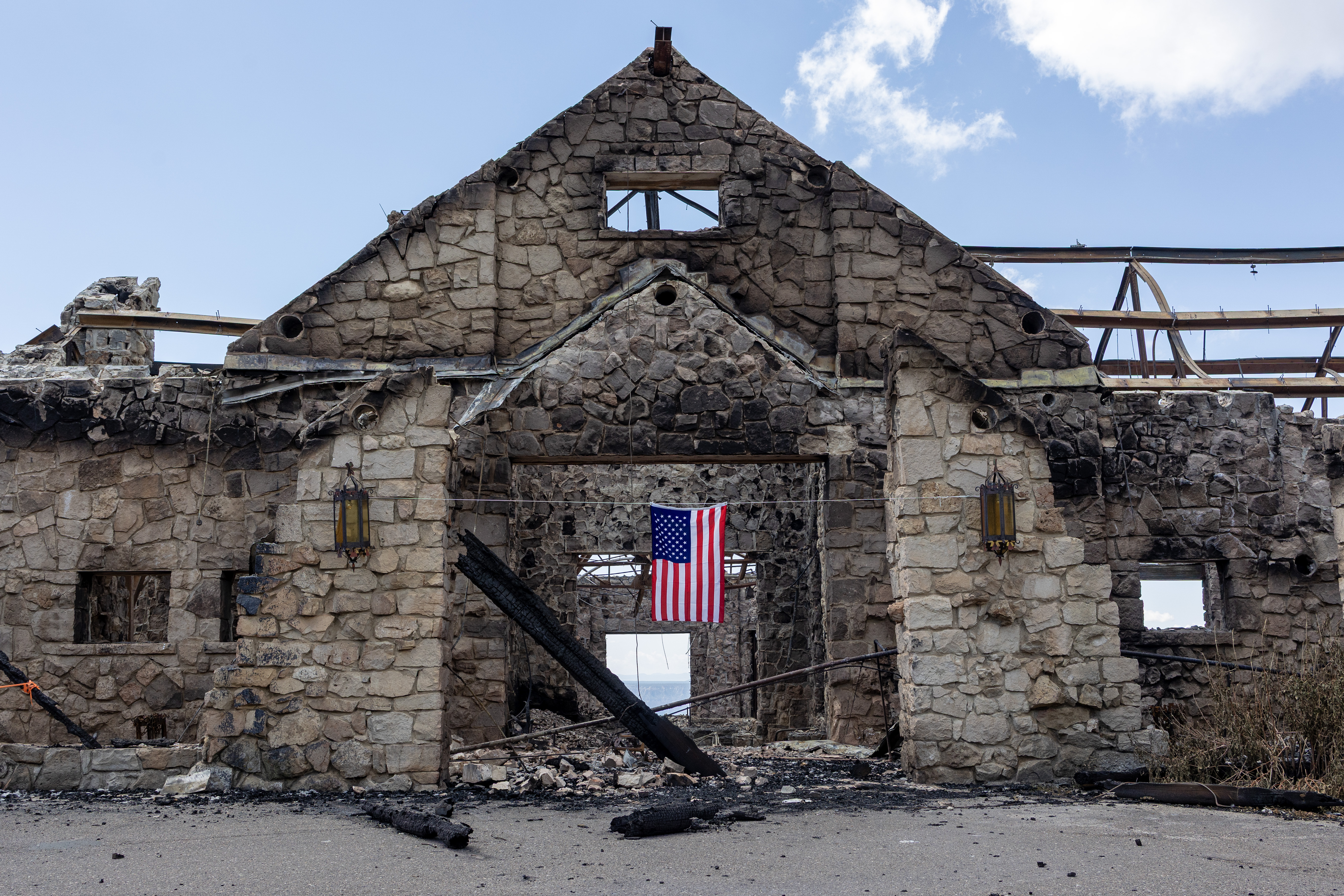
Remnants of the entrance to the Grand Canyon Lodge after it was destroyed by the Dragon Bravo Fire

The lodge was destroyed by the Dragon Bravo Fire on July 13, 2025.

The fire was caused by a lightning strike wildfire that quickly engulfed over 5,000 acres (2,000 ha) due to high temperatures and winds which spread the wildfire rapidly. Initial reports estimated that 50 to 80 structures had been destroyed inside the park at the North Rim, including the visitor center, gas station, waste water treatment plant, and employee housing.

== Description ==
Gilbert Stanley Underwood was employed by the Union Pacific Railroad to design resort hotels at Zion, Bryce Canyon, Yosemite, and Grand Canyon. Underwood purposefully designed the stonework to appear like natural rock outcroppings. The main lodge building was set slightly downhill into the side of the canyon and was the complex's central feature. The structure of both the original (c. 1927) and rebuilt (c. 1936) lodges was a mixture of Kaibab Limestone and peeled Ponderosa pine logs.

The original (c. 1927) lodge was a shallow U-shaped structure featured the central south-facing Sun Room with large windows and open stone terraces to either side. The east terrace featured an outdoor stone fireplace. The dining room ran along the western terrace with a bank of windows overlooking the canyon and a dramatic log truss roof augmented by concealed steel reinforcement. The eastern wing was a two-story structure with a recreation room on the lower level and a female employee dormitory on the upper level. The roof of the Sun Room was a terrace that stepped up into the main lobby, which was itself capped with an observation tower. The wings held bathing facilities, gift shops and a soda fountain, with a basement containing service areas, and a large room below the Sun Room. The original lodge, with its shallow roof, expressed California design influences, with elements of Spanish Revival style.

The rebuilt (c. 1936) lodge maintained the same general outline, but was simplified and strengthened against the severe winter snow loads of the North Rim. The Dining Room was reconstructed largely as it was before, but with a steeper roof pitch, and the Recreation room received similar treatment, without the original upper level, and on a smaller scale than the Dining Room. Compared with the original, there was greater use of stone throughout the lodge. The Sun Room was rebuilt in the same relationship to the lobby as before. The reconstruction included wrought iron hardware and lighting fixtures that complement the rustic wood and stone structure. The overall effect of the reconstructed lodge was one of more strongly expressed rustic character.

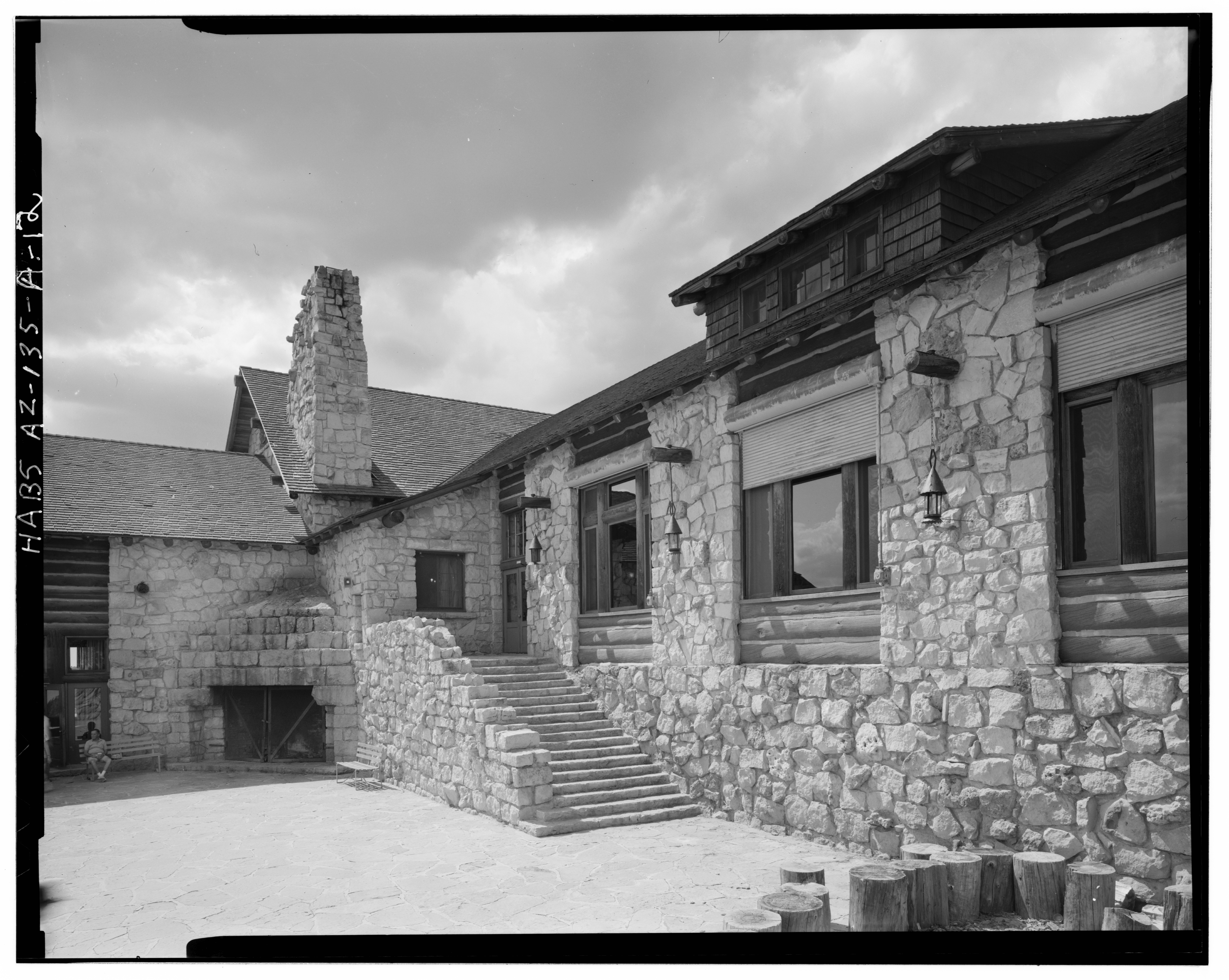
East side of lodge

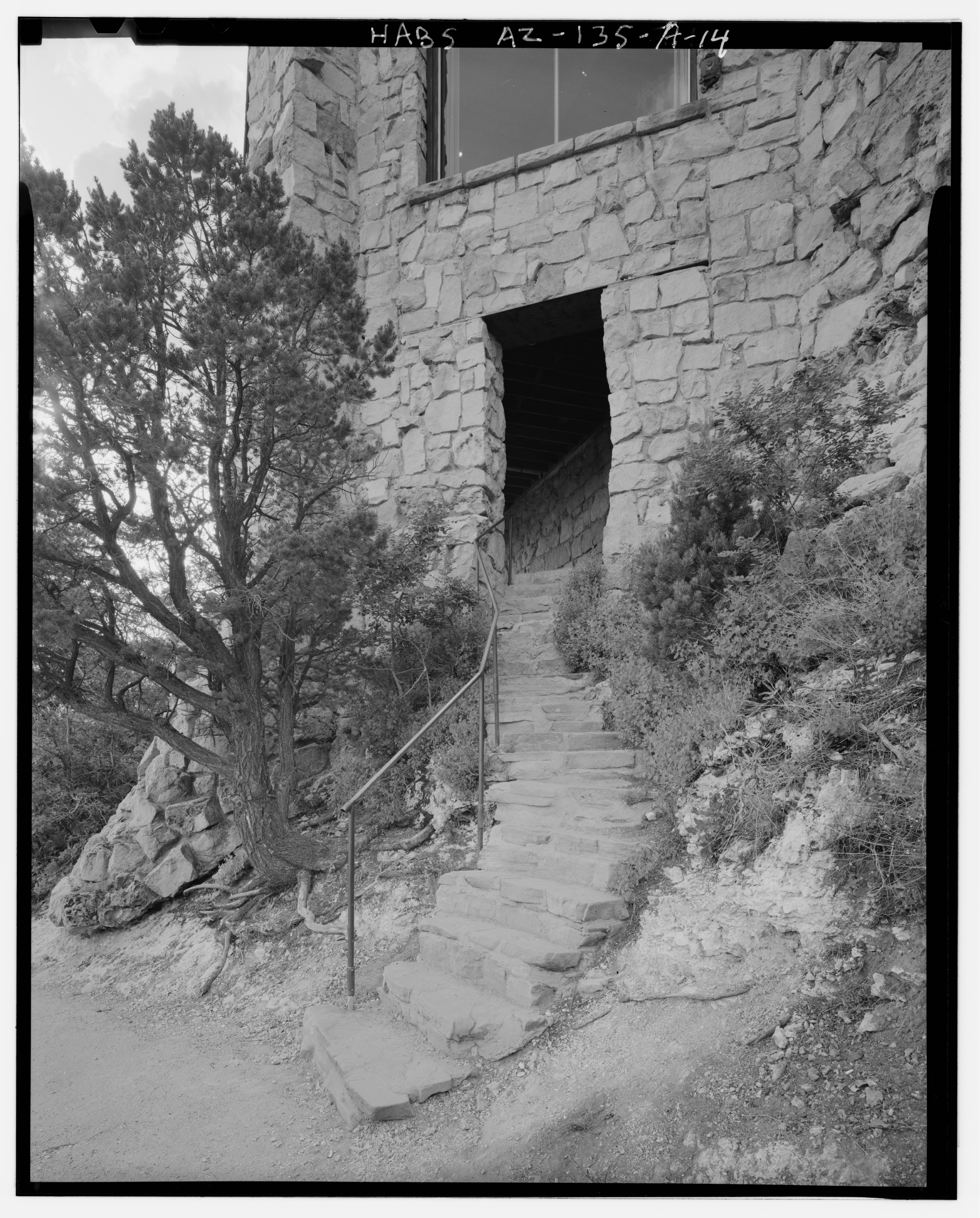
Steps to Moon Room

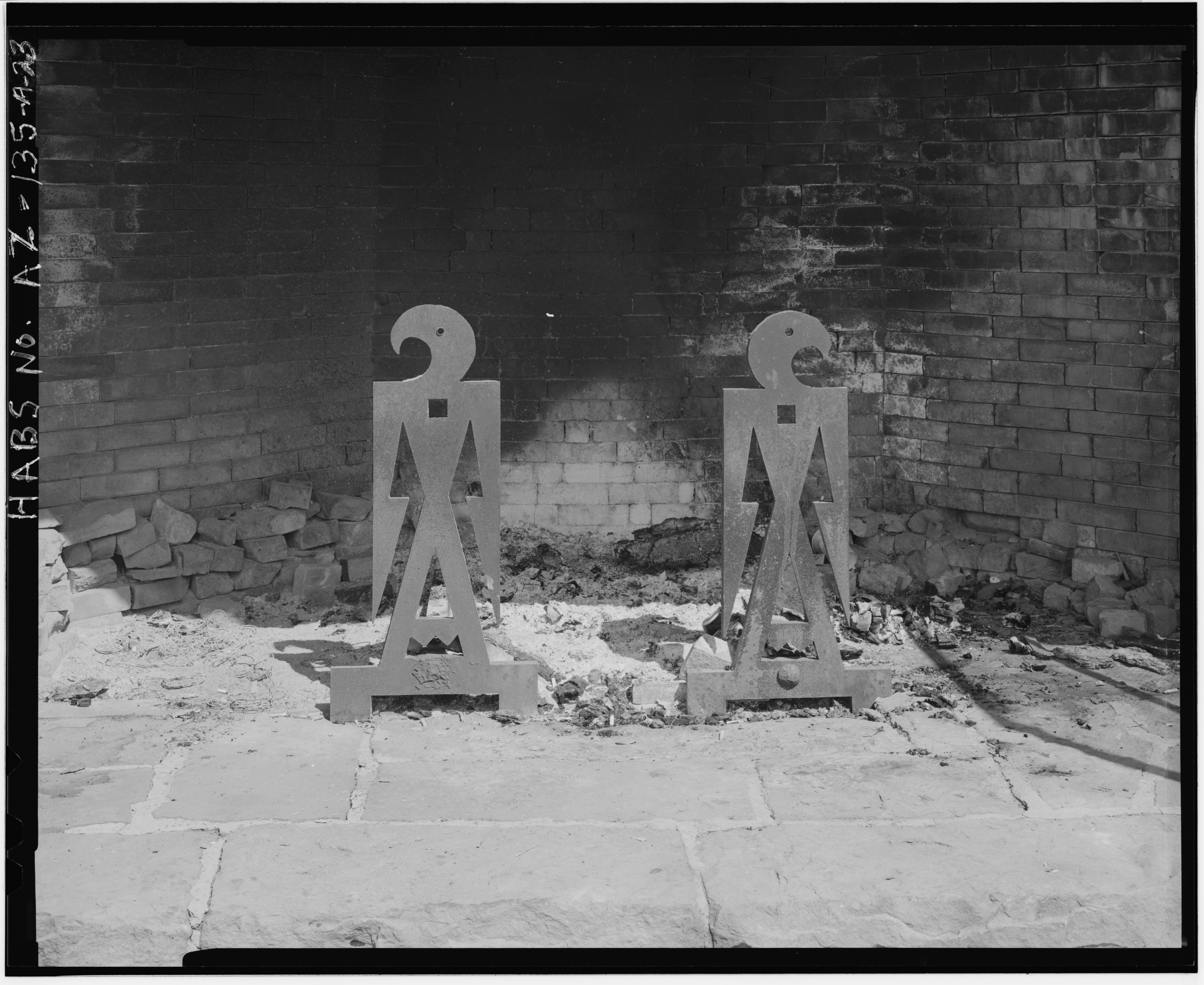
Fireplace andirons

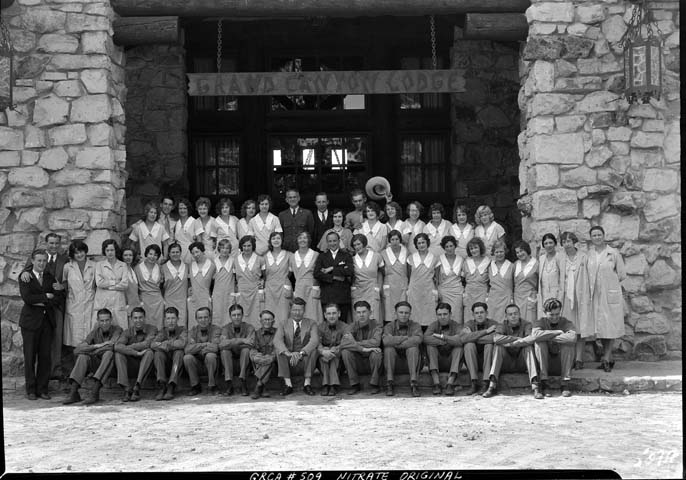
Grand Canyon Lodge personnel, c. 1930

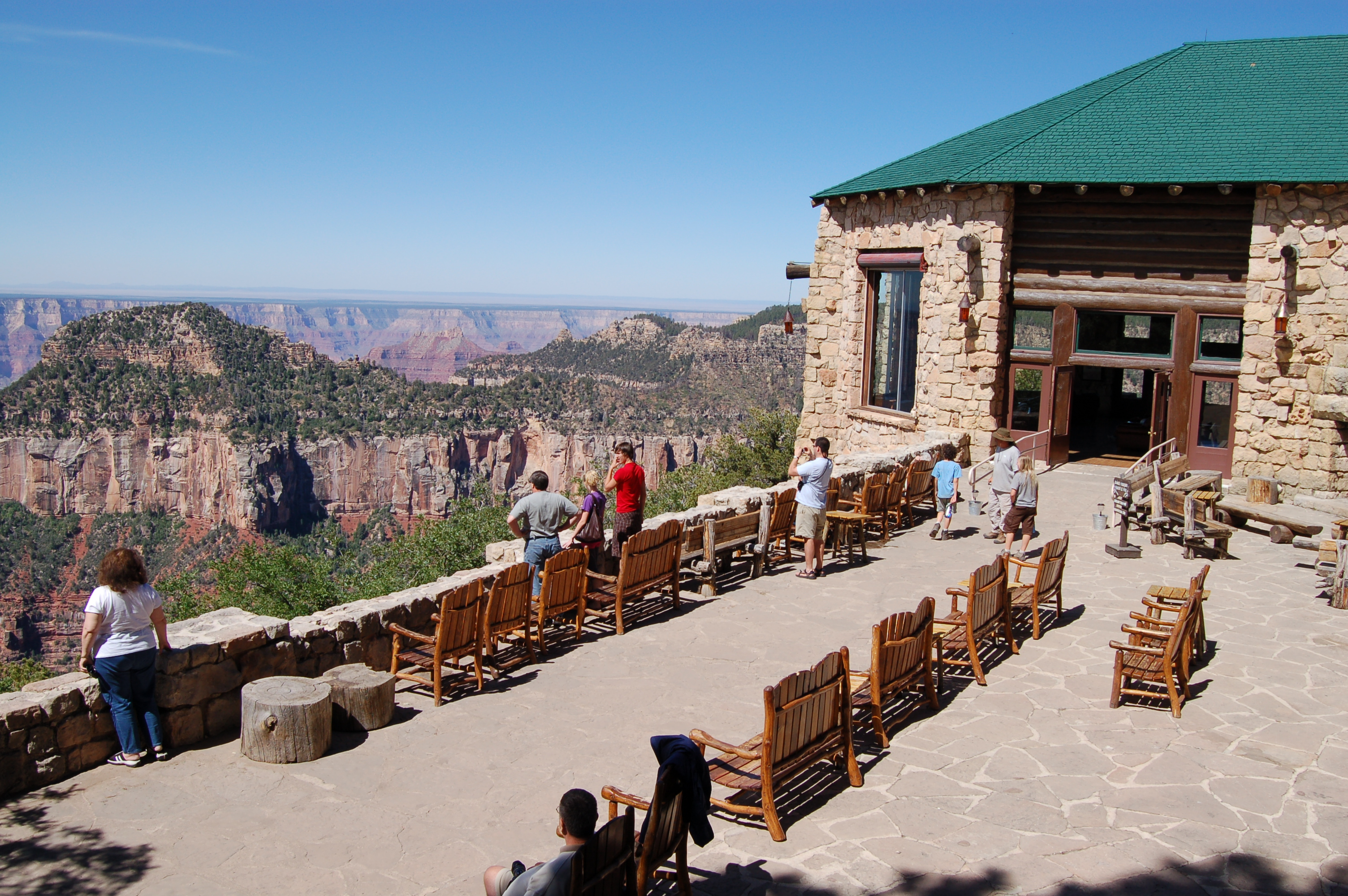
2007

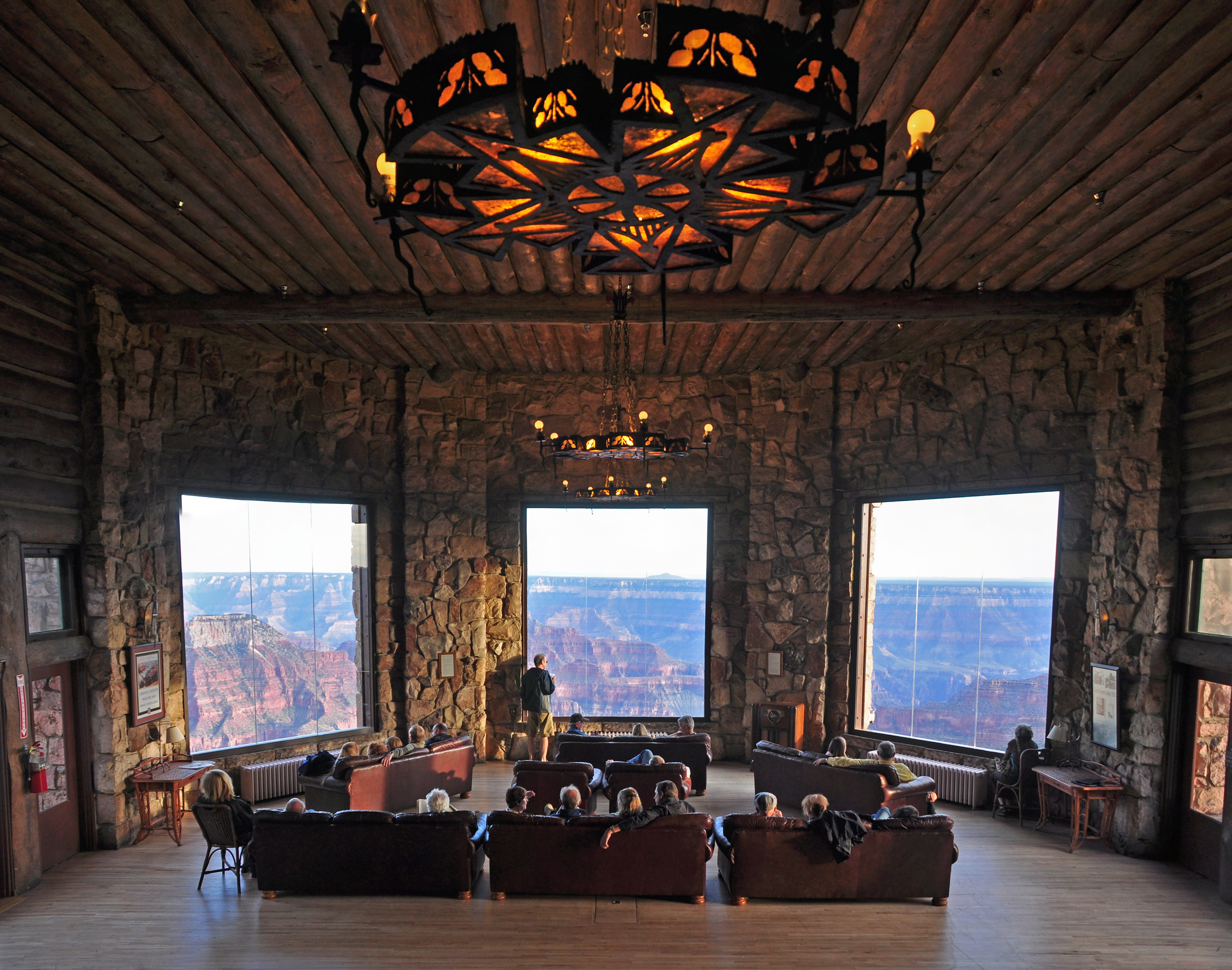
Sun Room

=== Cabins ===
All guest accommodation at the Grand Canyon Lodge were in small detached cabins, arranged in duplex or quadplex plans. Cabins fell into two categories: regular and deluxe. The cabin complex was significant in its retention of both classes of cabins. At other parks, the cabins had either been removed or the economy cabins had vanished, or, as at Zion, the main lodge had been destroyed.

The regular cabins, sometimes called economy cabins, were built as true log cabins with gabled roofs, each of two rooms divided by a log wall with a door. Located to the northwest of the lodge, 91 of these were built. 46 were altered with a bathroom extension of simulated log construction with a toilet for each side, while most of the remainder had single shared bathrooms built inside. Each cabin had an unroofed stone porch at either end.

The deluxe cabins, located to the northeast of the lodge, were frame structures sheathed with half-logs. 18 were duplexes (another two burned during the 1932 fire and were not replaced) and five were quadplexes. Floor plans and porch arrangements varied. All deluxe cabins shared prominent porches of heavy log construction, many of which were on the edge of the canyon and had their own views. Deluxe cabins included stone chimneys.

The regular cabins remained in use, divided into cabins that retained the original layout, and renovated cabins that combined both rooms into one larger cabin.

Preliminary maps released by the National Park Service on July 14, 2025, show that about two-thirds of the economy cabins and all but six of the deluxe cabins were destroyed in the fire, with the remainder listed as "threatened" as of publication time. It is unclear whether any more were lost after that time.

=== Access ===
This area is only accessible to cars via Arizona State Route 67, which is normally closed to vehicular traffic from December 1 until spring. The southern terminus of the Transept Trail and the northern terminus of the Bright Angel Point Trail are located here.

== See also ==
- Brighty of the Grand Canyon – a statue of the novel's subject, a burro, was located in the lobby of the lodge
