= Bright Angel Point Trail =

Grand Canyon hiking trail

Coordinates: 36.19703°N 112.05191°W

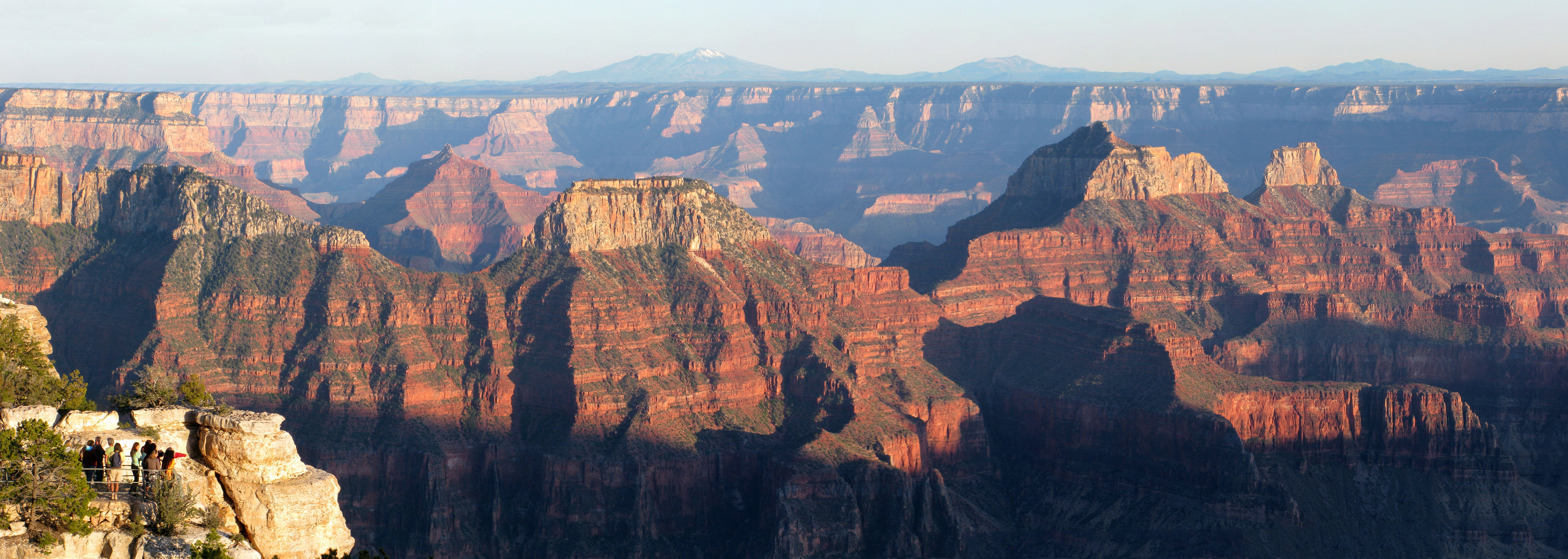
- Location: Grand Canyon National Park, Arizona, United States
- Use: Hiking
- Sights: Grand Canyon
- Hazards: Severe Weather; Overexertion; Dehydration; Flash Flood

The Bright Angel Point Trail is a hiking trail located on the North Rim of the Grand Canyon National Park, located in the U.S. state of Arizona.

== Description ==
The Bright Angel Point Trail begins on the south side of the Grand Canyon Lodge complex, at the southern terminus of the Transept Trail, on the North Rim of the Grand Canyon.

The trail is paved over its entire 0.75 miles (1.2 km) length. This easy trail follows a ridge line at the end of the Bright Angel Peninsula to Bright Angel Point, which offers a panoramic view of the canyon from its north side.

Portions of the Cottonwood Campground, 4,000 feet (1,200 m) below rim, are visible from the end of the trail. Grand Canyon Village on the South Rim is visible about 10 miles (16 km) away across the canyon.

There is no water available on trail.

Hikers and tourists should stay off the trail when thunderstorms are in the area. Exposed points along the rim attract lightning.

== See also ==
- List of trails in Grand Canyon National Park
