= Jacob Lake, Arizona =

Unincorporated community in Arizona, United States

Jacob Lake
- Unincorporated community
- Etymology: Jacob Hamblin
- Location of Jacob Lake within Coconino County

- Location of Jacob Lake Jacob Lake (the United States)
- Coordinates: 36°42′48″N 112°12′59″W
- Country: United States
- State: Arizona
- County: Coconino
- Time zone: UTC-7 (MST [no DST])
- ZIP code: 86022
- Area code: 928
- GNIS feature ID: 6336

Jacob Lake is a small unincorporated community on the Kaibab Plateau in Coconino County, Arizona, United States, at the junction of U.S. Route 89A and State Route 67. Named after the Mormon explorer Jacob Hamblin, the town is known as the "Gateway to the Grand Canyon" because it is the starting point of Route 67, the only paved road leading to the North Rim of the Grand Canyon some 44 miles (71 km) to the south. The town itself consists of the Jacob Lake Inn which maintains motel rooms and cabins, a restaurant, lunch counter, gift shop, bakery, and general store; a gas station/garage; campground; and a visitors center run by the U.S. Forest Service. In the summer months, there is also a nearby center for horse rides.

== History ==
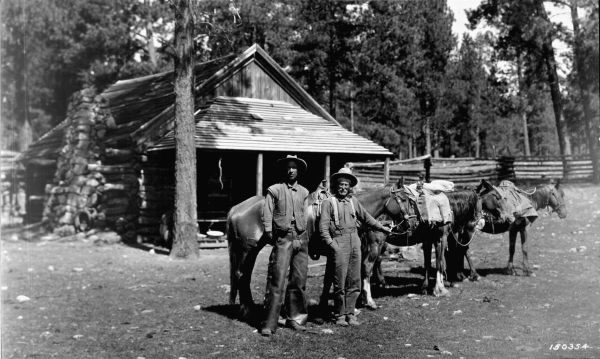
"Uncle" Jim Owen (right) and his pack train at Jacob Lake, 1918. Owen, a famous guide and hunter, was known as the "Cougar killer" of the Kaibab.

Jacob Lake Inn was founded in 1923 by Harold I. Bowman and his wife Nina Nixon Bowman to facilitate tourists attempting to reach the Grand Canyon. Their ancestors had been early converts to the Church of Jesus Christ of Latter-day Saints and had taken important roles in the settlement and exploration of southern Utah and northern Arizona. Nina's great-grandfather, Edwin D. Woolley, was a close friend and associate of Joseph Smith and a successful businessman in Nauvoo. He remained financially successful and was a trusted (though sometimes contrary) counselor to Brigham Young once they moved to Utah. See Kimball-Snow-Woolley family. Nina's grandfather, Franklin B. Woolley, had been involved in some of the first mapping expeditions in southern Utah and northern Arizona. He was later killed by Indians on his way back to Utah from California with a load of goods for his store in St. George, Utah. Harold's father, Henry E. Bowman, was also a successful merchant. He had lived in Kanab, Utah, where Harold was born, but soon moved his family to the Mormon colonies in Mexico and settled at Colonia Dublan. There he set up a profitable store doing business as far away as Mexico City until his family and many others were driven out of the country in 1912 during the Mexican Revolution. In the midst of this turmoil, young Harold was kidnapped by bandits and held for ransom, but was rescued by his uncle. Harold returned with his family to the United States and later served in the First World War.

== Geography ==
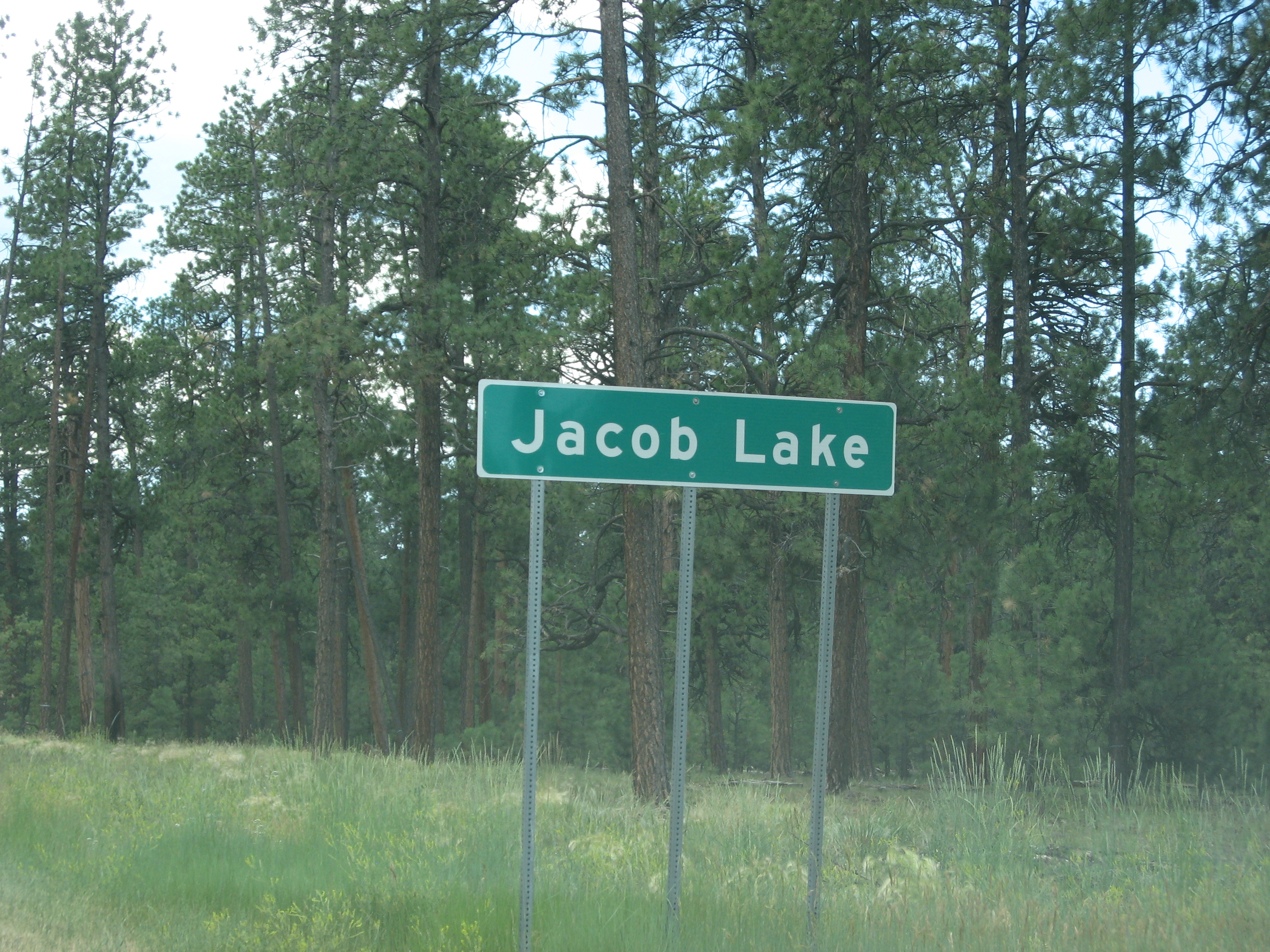
Jacob Lake city sign, July 2009

Jacob Lake is situated at an elevation of roughly 8,000 feet (2,400 m) in a large ponderosa pine forest which is part of the Kaibab National Forest. In its lower elevations, the Kaibab Plateau consists of pinon-juniper forests, and the ponderosas give way to aspen, spruce, and fir higher up. However, the ponderosa biosphere is home to the Kaibab Squirrel. Jacob Lake is also home to mule deer, coyotes, porcupines, bobcats, numerous bird species, horned lizards, and mountain lions.

The town is roughly a mile from Jacob Lake. This pond was named for Jacob Hamblin, an early Mormon pioneer of southern Utah and northern Arizona. He was shown its location probably in 1858 by the Kaibab band of Southern Paiutes who summered on the plateau, and with whom he was on friendly relations.

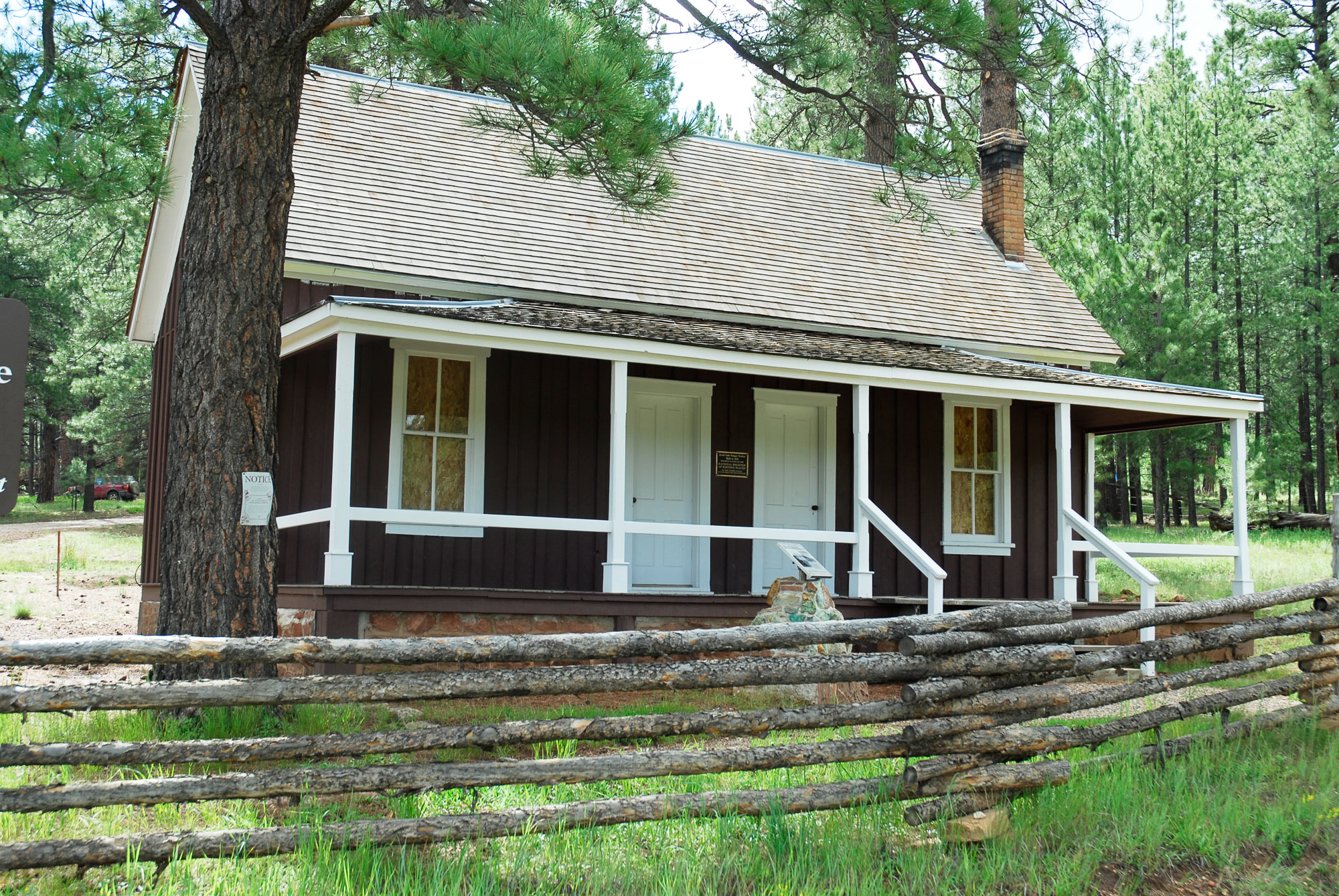
The historic Jacob Lake Ranger Station, built in 1910. Located one mile west and south of North Kaibab Visitor Center.

Though small, the lake was a permanent source of water which was a rarity on the porous Kaibab Limestone. Known to some as the "waterless mountain," in pioneer days the Kaibab was called the "Buckskin Mountain," but the name itself is a Paiute word meaning "mountain inside out," or "mountain lying down." However, Jacob Lake's situation and permanent water made it an important stopping place for travelers moving from Utah into Arizona. Despite its diminutive size, locals are fond of saying that Jacob Lake "waters more deer than the entire Pacific Ocean."

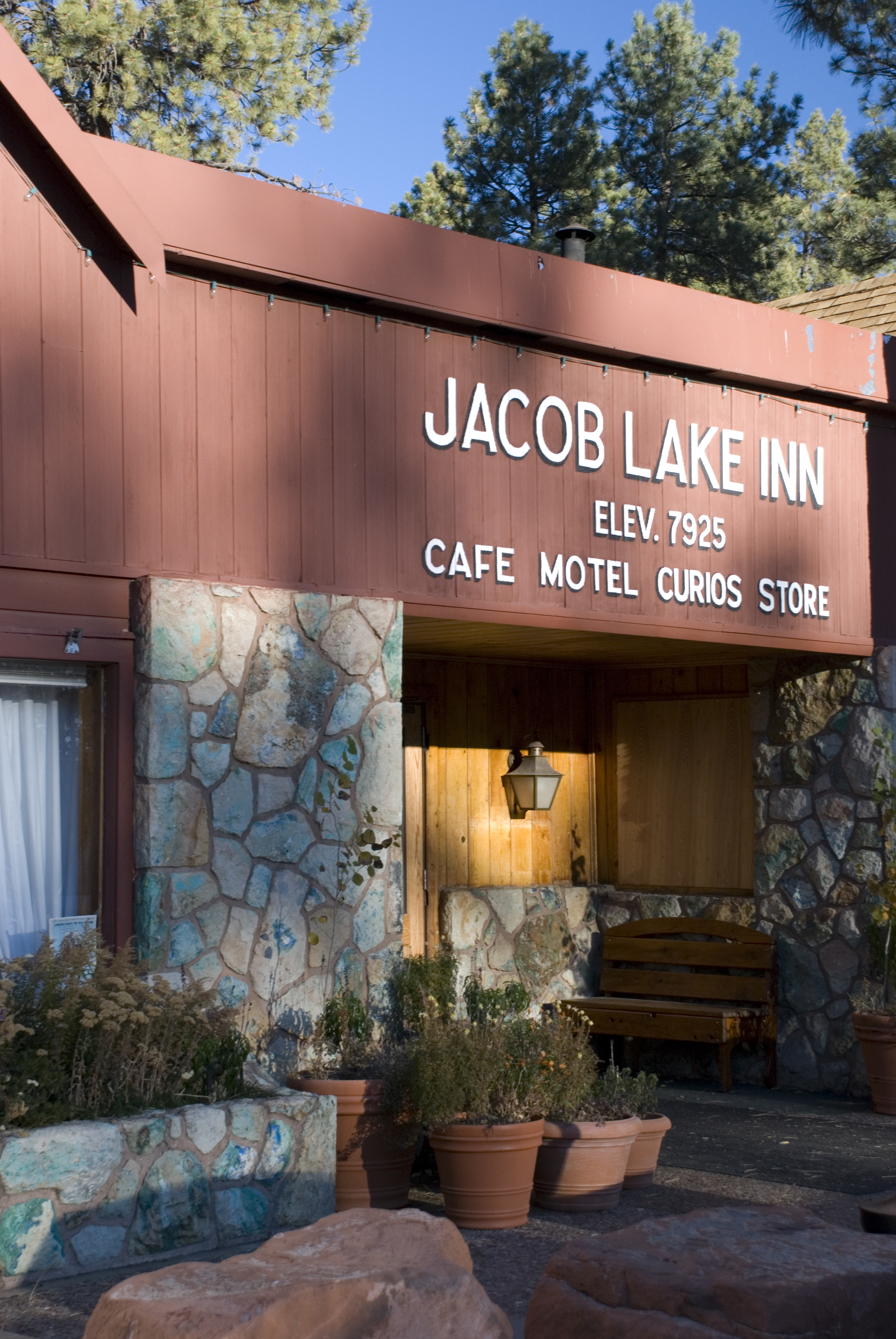
Jacob Lake Inn, July 2007

The vicinity of Jacob Lake remained popular despite, or perhaps because of, its relative inaccessibility. It was an important source of lumber and game for local settlements, and cattle would graze on the Kaibab's abundant grass during the summer months. During the winter months, ten feet of snow was not an unusual occurrence.

In the late 19th and early 20th centuries, the Jacob Lake area and the rest of the Kaibab was the summer range of the "Bar Z outfit" or the Grand Canyon Cattle company. This brand ran upwards of 100,000 cattle throughout the Arizona Strip. In the early 1900s "Buffalo Jones" used the Bar Z's corrals at Jacob Lake to pen a herd of buffalo which he then drove onto a ranch in House Rock Valley on the East side of the Kaibab. These same corrals were later home to a "cattalo," a hybrid between one of Jones' buffalos and a domesticated Hereford bull. The remnants of this buffalo herd are still in House Rock and occasionally wander up on top of the Kaibab to the Grand Canyon.

US President Theodore Roosevelt frequented the area of Jacob Lake on his trips to the Kaibab to hunt mountain lion and visit the Grand Canyon. It was also one of the haunts of the colorful Uncle Jim Owens, who reputedly rode with Jesse James and acted as a game warden on the Kaibab. His real life adventures provided fodder for the western writer Zane Grey and he was featured in the beloved children's book Brighty of the Grand Canyon.

== Climate ==
Under the Köppen climate classification, Jacob Lake has either a warm-summer Mediterranean climate (Csb) or a warm-summer continental Mediterranean climate (Dsb), depending on which variant of the system is used.

Climate data for Jacob Lake, Arizona
Month	Jan	Feb	Mar	Apr	May	Jun	Jul	Aug	Sep	Oct	Nov	Dec	Year
Record high °F (°C)	65 (18)	67 (19)	73 (23)	77 (25)	88 (31)	92 (33)	95 (35)	92 (33)	90 (32)	78 (26)	72 (22)	70 (21)	95 (35)
Mean maximum °F (°C)	57 (14)	56 (13)	60 (16)	67 (19)	78 (26)	85 (29)	87 (31)	85 (29)	82 (28)	73 (23)	62 (17)	55 (13)	89 (32)
Mean daily maximum °F (°C)	40 (4)	42 (6)	46 (8)	53 (12)	65 (18)	74 (23)	79 (26)	77 (25)	72 (22)	59 (15)	47 (8)	41 (5)	58 (14)
Daily mean °F (°C)	27.9 (−2.3)	29.6 (−1.3)	33.4 (0.8)	39.7 (4.3)	51.2 (10.7)	60.1 (15.6)	64.9 (18.3)	62.9 (17.2)	57.2 (14.0)	45.8 (7.7)	35.1 (1.7)	29.4 (−1.4)	44.8 (7.1)
Mean daily minimum °F (°C)	16 (−9)	17 (−8)	21 (−6)	27 (−3)	37 (3)	45 (7)	51 (11)	49 (9)	43 (6)	33 (1)	23 (−5)	17 (−8)	32 (0)
Mean minimum °F (°C)	−4.0 (−20.0)	−0.8 (−18.2)	2.2 (−16.6)	12.3 (−10.9)	23.2 (−4.9)	34.1 (1.2)	42.6 (5.9)	41.3 (5.2)	31.0 (−0.6)	19.0 (−7.2)	6.9 (−13.9)	−0.4 (−18.0)	−7.2 (−21.8)
Record low °F (°C)	−35 (−37)	−30 (−34)	−20 (−29)	−5 (−21)	9 (−13)	24 (−4)	29 (−2)	25 (−4)	15 (−9)	−5 (−21)	−13 (−25)	−26 (−32)	−35 (−37)
Average precipitation inches (mm)	1.39 (35)	1.22 (31)	2.56 (65)	1.49 (38)	1.19 (30)	0.78 (20)	2.70 (69)	2.77 (70)	1.39 (35)	1.68 (43)	1.73 (44)	1.98 (50)	20.9 (530)
Average snowfall inches (cm)	15.2 (39)	14.9 (38)	27.7 (70)	11.6 (29)	3.3 (8.4)	0 (0)	0 (0)	0 (0)	0.1 (0.25)	2.9 (7.4)	14.0 (36)	15.6 (40)	105.5 (268)
Source: Western Regional Climate Center

== See also ==
- Colorado Plateau
- Lee's Ferry
- Vermilion Cliffs
- Vermilion Cliffs National Monument

== Citations ==
- Rider, Rowland W. and Paulsen, Deirdre Murray.The Roll Away Saloon: Cowboy Tales of the Arizona Strip, Utah State University Press, 1985.
- Arrington, Leonard J. From Quaker to Latter-day Saint: Bishop Edwin D. Woolley, Deseret Book, 1976.
- Rich, Effie Dean Bowman. Oral History of Jacob Lake Inn.
- Hamblin, Jacob. Jacob Hamblin: A Narrative of His Personal Experience: Faith Promoting Series no.5 (1881).
