= List of places in Arizona (I–J) =

This is a list of cities, towns, unincorporated communities, counties, and other places in the U.S. state of Arizona, which start with the letters I and J. This list is derived from the Geographic Names Information System, which has numerous errors, so it also includes many ghost towns and historical places that are not necessarily communities or actual populated places. This list also includes information on the number and names of counties in which the place lies, its lower and upper ZIP code bounds, if applicable, its U.S. Geological Survey (USGS) reference number(s) (called the GNIS), class as designated by the USGS, and incorporated community located in (if applicable).

== I ==
| Name of place | Number of counties | Principal county | GNIS #(s) | Class | Located in | ZIP code | |
| Name of place | Number of counties | Principal county | GNIS #(s) | Class | Located in | Lower | Upper |
|---|---|---|---|---|---|---|---|
| Icehouse Canyon | 1 | Maricopa County | 2582800 | CDP | | | |
| Indian Gardens | 1 | Coconino County | 30342 | Populated Place | | 86336 | |
| Indian Hot Springs | 1 | Graham County | 6214 | Populated Place | | | |
| Indian Pine | 1 | Navajo County | 30351 | Populated Place | | | |
| Indian Wells | 1 | Navajo County | 2582801 | CDP | | 86031 | |
| Inspiration | 1 | Gila County | 30392 | Populated Place | | 85532 | |
| Iron Springs | 1 | Yavapai County | 30427 | Populated Place | | 86330 | |
| Itak | 1 | Pima County | 24471 | Populated Place | | | |

== J ==
| Name of place | Number of counties | Principal county | GNIS #(s) | Class | Located in | ZIP code | |
| Name of place | Number of counties | Principal county | GNIS #(s) | Class | Located in | Lower | Upper |
|---|---|---|---|---|---|---|---|
| Jackrabbit House | 1 | Pinal County | 24472 | Populated Place | | | |
| Jacob Lake | 1 | Coconino County | 6336 | Populated Place | | 86022 | |
| Jakes Corner | 1 | Gila County | 2582802 | CDP | | 85541 | |
| Jeddito | 1 | Navajo County | 2408440 | CDP | | 86034 | |
| Jerome | 1 | Yavapai County | 2412804 | Civil (Town) | | 86331 | |
| Johnson | 1 | Cochise County | 6470 | Populated Place | | 85609 | |
| Joseph City | 1 | Navajo County | 2582803 | CDP | | 86032 | |
| Juniper Heights | 1 | Yavapai County | 30659 | Populated Place | | | |
