= Kaibab =

Kaibab (from a Native American word meaning "mountain lying down") may refer to the following (all in the Southwestern United States):

- Kaibab, Arizona, a small community
- Kaibab Indian Reservation, Arizona
- Kaibab National Forest, Arizona
- Kaibab Limestone, Arizona, Utah, Nevada, and California
- Kaibab Plateau, Arizona and Utah
- Kaibab squirrel, found on the Kaibab Plateau
- North Kaibab Trail, Grand Canyon National Park, Arizona
- South Kaibab Trail, Grand Canyon National Park, Arizona
- Kaibab Plateau-North Rim Parkway (Arizona State Route 67)
