= Indian Gardens =

Indian garden, Indian Garden, or Indian Gardens may refer to:

- Indian Gardens, Arizona, populated place in Oak Creek Canyon, Coconino County, Arizona, United States
- Havasupai Gardens, formerly Indian Garden, place on Bright Angel Trail, Grand Canyon, Coconino County, Arizona, United States
- Category:Gardens in India, in particular
  - Mughal garden, built by the Mughals
  - List of botanical gardens in India
- History of gardening §§ Indian subcontinental gardens and Mesoamerican gardens

== See also ==
- India Garden, Cleveland Cultural Gardens, Rockefeller Park, Cleveland, Ohio, United States
