= River Trail (Arizona) =

Grand Canyon hiking trail

Coordinates: 36.09813°N 112.11058°W

- Zoroaster Temple and suspension bridges from River Trail
- Length: 2 mi (3.2 km)
- Location: Grand Canyon National Park, Arizona, United States
- Trailheads: Bright Angel Trail; South Kaibab Trail
- Use: Hiking; Stock (Horse use)
- Highest point: Cliff above Colorado River, 2,800 ft (850 m)
- Lowest point: Colorado River, 2,400 ft (730 m)
- Difficulty: Moderate
- Season: Year Round
- Sights: Grand Canyon; Colorado River
- Hazards: Severe Weather; Overexertion; Dehydration

The River Trail is a hiking trail in Grand Canyon National Park, located in the U.S. state of Arizona. This trail connects the end of the Bright Angel Trail with Phantom Ranch and the South Kaibab Trail.

== Description ==
Mileages and features along River Trail
Distance (mi)	Elv (ft)	Location	Trail Junction
0	2526	River Resthouse, Pipe Creek	Bright Angel Trail
1.3	2491	Silver suspension bridge	
2	2600	South Kaibab Trail	South Kaibab Trail

Though it has no official trailhead, the River Trail is an important link in the trail system in Grand Canyon. This trail connects the Bright Angel Trail at its western terminus with Phantom Ranch and the Bright Angel Campground via the silver suspension bridge. One mile (1.6 km) beyond the silver bridge is the eastern terminus and junction with the South Kaibab Trail. Heading north on the South Kaibab Trail leads to the Black Suspension Bridge and across the river to the North Kaibab Trail junction.

=== Condition ===
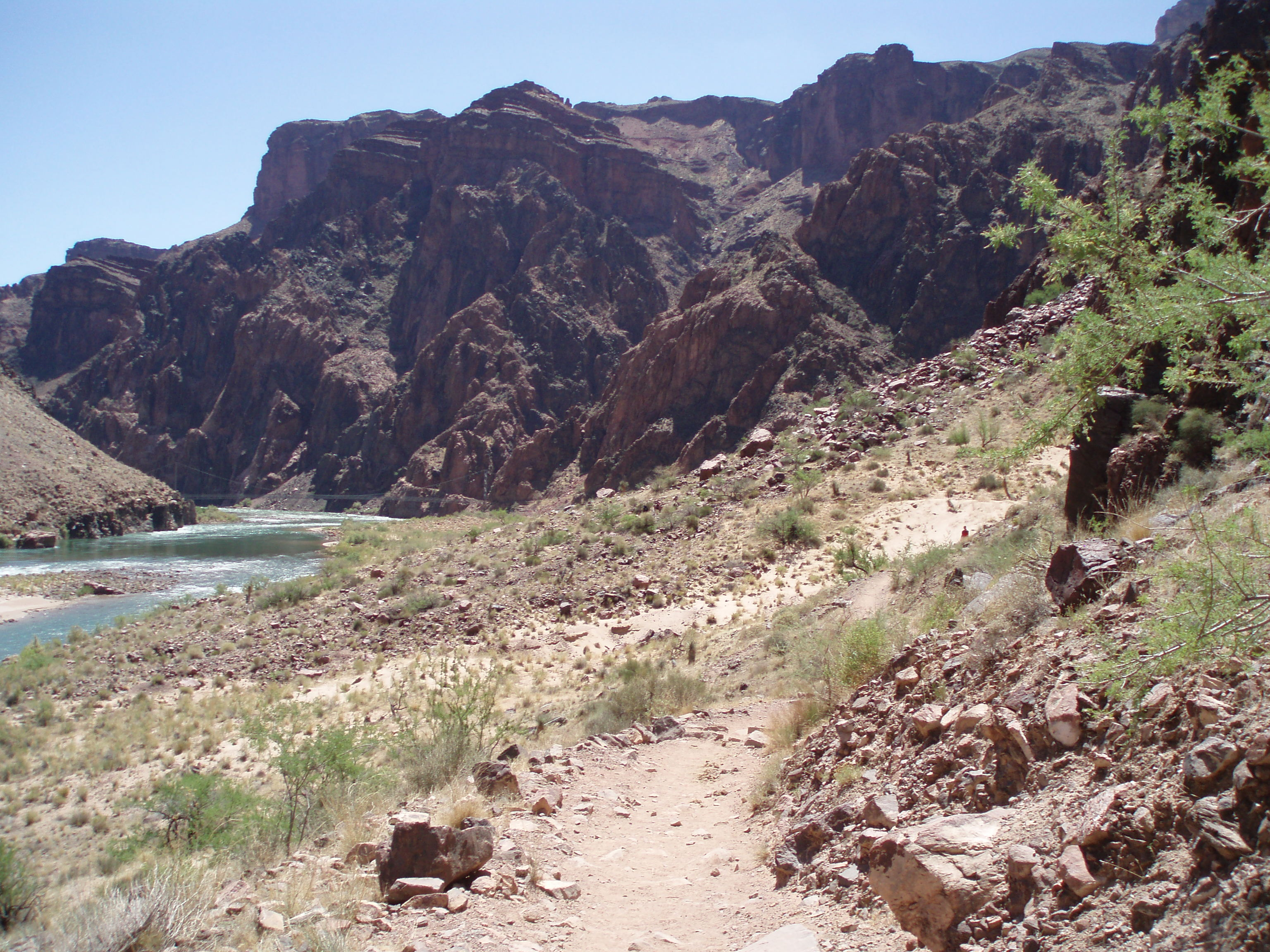
Sand dunes along River Trail

Grand Canyon National Park categorizes the River Trail as a corridor trail, and receives regular maintenance and patrols by park rangers.

On 31 July and 1 August 2006, passing thunderstorms eroded long sections of the River Trail at an area called the sand dunes, exposing power and water lines that run along and under the trail's road bed. The sand dunes are an area of trail made up of beach sand that winds have blown up the side of the inner gorge along the south bank of the Colorado River. The trail was briefly closed to mule traffic but remained open to hikers. Repairs were expected to take seven to fourteen days.

=== Water availability ===
The primary water source along the River Trail is the Colorado River. If water is to be taken from the river for drinking, it must be either filtered, treated, or boiled before consuming.

Due to the proximity to Phantom Ranch and the Bright Angel Campground, hikers who are not in a life-or-death need for water should proceed across the silver suspension bridge past the mule corral, where a water spigot is located near the restroom building before the junction with the South Kaibab Trail and North Kaibab Trail.

=== Camping ===
Camping is not allowed along the River Trail. Hikers must proceed to the Bright Angel Campground where they can camp with a permit issued by the Grand Canyon National Park Backcountry Information Center. Use of the campground overnight is regulated by the National Park Service, and they call for a maximum number of groups (7 to 11 people) and parties (1 to 6 people), as well as a maximum total number of persons.

The closest campground to the River Trail is the Bright Angel Campground, located about 1-mile (1.6 km) north of the junction with the silver suspension bridge. The three letter code indicates the park's use area designation:

Overnight camping areas near River Trail
Area	Name	Type	Group(s)		Parties	Max People
CBG	Bright Angel	Campground	2	and	31	90

Use permits are available on a first-come, first-served basis from the park's Backcountry Information Center. Requests are taken beginning on the 1st day of the month, up to four months before the requested first night of camping.

=== Hazards ===
Hazards hikers can encounter along the River Trail include dehydration, sudden rainstorms, flash flooding, loose footing, rockfall, encounters with wildlife, and extreme heat. At the Colorado River, additional hazards include hypothermia (due to the river's consistently cold temperatures), trauma (due to collisions with boulders in rapids), and drowning.

== See also ==
- List of trails in Grand Canyon National Park
- Grand Canyon
