= Phantom Ranch =

Historic Grand Canyon lodging

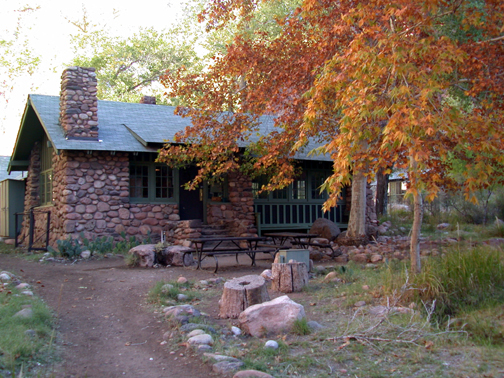
- The Phantom Ranch Canteen
- Interactive map of Phantom Ranch
- Coordinates: 36°06′22″N 112°05′41″W
- Operated by: Xanterra Travel Collection
- Owner: National Park Service
- Established: 1922

Phantom Ranch is a lodge inside Grand Canyon National Park in Arizona. It sits at the bottom of Grand Canyon, on the east side of Bright Angel Creek, a little over half a mile north of the Creek's confluence with the Colorado River. Opened in 1922, Phantom Ranch is a member of Historic Hotels of America, the official program of the National Trust for Historic Preservation.

== History ==
The site of Phantom Ranch and the areas around it were used by various Native American peoples for millennia. Numerous artifacts, including split-twig figurines carbon dated at 4000 years old, have been discovered in nearby caves. Puebloan peoples built pit houses and a ceremonial kiva in the area around AD 1050, and likely survived by hunting and growing corn, beans, and squash. Paiute and Havasupai people also inhabited Grand Canyon for many centuries and probably visited the area, although no direct evidence of this has yet been discovered.

The earliest recorded visit by European Americans took place in 1869, when John Wesley Powell and his company camped on the beach at the confluence of Bright Angel Creek and the Colorado River. It was Powell who gave Bright Angel Creek its name, contrasting its clear, sparkling waters with the turbulent, salty, muddy waters of a creek he and his men had passed earlier and named Dirty Devil. Powell explored the area briefly and discovered the Puebloan ruins.

In 1903, after François E. Matthes completed his pioneering survey work of Grand Canyon for the US Geological Survey, Edwin Woolley and other investors formed the Grand Canyon Transportation Company, hoping to develop the tourist potential of the Canyon's north rim in the same way that the Santa Fe Railroad was doing at the south rim. Woolley hired his son-in-law David Rust to improve an ancient Native American route that Matthes had used to travel down Bright Angel Creek to the Colorado River. By 1907 Rust and his crew had completed the trail work and added a small tent camp alongside the Creek at the bottom. Rust planted native willows and cottonwoods to give the camp shade, grew alfalfa (for livestock), peaches, and plums, and raised chickens and rabbits as food for guests. Theodore Roosevelt, who as president had declared Grand Canyon a National Monument in 1908, traveled down to the camp during a hunting expedition in 1913; in honor of this visit the site became known as Roosevelt Camp.

Roosevelt's enthusiasm for Grand Canyon helped lead to its incorporation into the National Park System in 1919. Rust's concession for the camp was transferred to the Fred Harvey Company, which hired American architect Mary Colter to design permanent lodging for the site. Construction presented a major challenge, as all the building materials except rock had to be hauled down by mules. Colter's solution was to create buildings from on-site rock and rough-hewn wood, in an architectural style that would come to be known as National Park Service Rustic. Fred Harvey officials had intended to call the new lodge Roosevelt Chalet, but Colter insisted on the more evocative "Phantom Ranch", taking the name from nearby Phantom Creek and Phantom Canyon. When the Ranch opened on November 9, 1922, it consisted of a central cooking and dining hall surrounded by three guest cabins and a caretaker's cabin; other structures, not designed by Colter, included a barn, chicken house, rabbit run, blacksmith shop, and water reservoir.

The Ranch's initial success quickly led to plans for enlargement and additional features. A small orchard and a vegetable garden were planted using some of the same land that Rust had previously cultivated. In 1925 four tent cabins, each sleeping four persons, were added, followed by a wooden bath house and an electric power generator. In 1927–28 Colter oversaw the construction of a recreation hall, eight new cabins, and an enlargement of the dining hall.

During the Great Depression the Civilian Conservation Corps made a number of upgrades to the Ranch, including a mule corral, the Trans-Canyon Telephone Line, improved plumbing and sewage systems, and a 35' x 70' pond-shaped swimming pool, fed by the waters of Bright Angel Creek. The 1930s saw the Ranch's popularity continue to grow, its isolation and relaxed atmosphere drawing many wealthy and notable guests, some of whom would stay for days or even weeks at a time. The writer Adrian Harbin, after a 1937 visit, wrote:

Phantom Ranch is one of the earth’s most restful spots. Time for a swim or shower before dinner. This meal is served family style and if you prefer to stand after eight miles in the saddle, dinner will be served on a shelf.

Through the end of World War II mule riding was the main method of getting around in Grand Canyon and the most popular way for tourists to experience the views that only traveling below the rims could bring. This began to change in the late 1940s as more and more people―many of them former soldiers who were used to walking long distances with packs on their backs―became interested in the idea of hiking for recreation and sight-seeing. Well into the 1950s commercial mule trips from both the south and north rims were responsible for transporting about 2/3 of the guests that stayed at Phantom Ranch, with hikers taking any remaining space (mostly in the four tent cabins from 1925) on a first-come, first-serve basis. As the popularity of hiking continued to grow, however, the need for different priorities became apparent. During Easter weekend in 1964 nearly 1000 hikers arrived at the Ranch with the intention of spending the night, leading the National Park Service to finally establish a reservation system for the Ranch and begin looking for ways to add additional hiker accommodations.

The growing crowds and a natural disaster combined to put increasing strains on the Ranch's infrastructure as the 1960s progressed. In 1966 an immense flash flood swept through the inner canyon, stranding visitors and mules at the Ranch and damaging or destroying numerous buildings and structures in the area. The flooding also uprooted many of the cottonwood trees lining the banks of Bright Angel Creek. By the time the waters receded most of nearby Bright Angel Campground had been destroyed as well. Repairs from the flood took several years to complete. The increase in visitors in this period caused recurring maintenance problems for the swimming pool which, along with more stringent hygiene regulations, led to the pool's permanent closing by the early 1970s. A sewage treatment plant, replacing the overburdened septic tanks that had been installed by the CCC in the 1930s, was completed in 1981.

In June 2020, the sewage treatment plant began experiencing problems and it soon became clear that "critical rehabilitation" would be needed. The project has been estimated to take 18 to 24 months and in the meantime, usage levels in the area were reduced in order to reduce the load on the plant. Hiker dormitories, already closed since March 2020 due to the ongoing COVID-19 pandemic, remained closed through 2022, along with the showers; nearby Bright Angel Campground will be limited to 50 percent capacity. Visitation levels have been much above its designed capacity and the $3 million rehabilitation is only a temporary measure; the plant will eventually need to be fully replaced.

== Phantom Ranch in the 21st century ==
Phantom Ranch remains a popular destination, and is considered one of the most difficult hotels in the United States to get reservations for. All accommodations are offered 15 months in advance via a monthly lottery system and usually sell out immediately.

The site currently includes nine regular cabins which sleep 1–4 persons, four or five of which are taken almost every night by mule riders. In addition, there are two large cabins, sleeping 8–10 persons, which are used by Colorado River boat groups and big hiking parties. All cabins are equipped with bedding, a cold water sink, a toilet, liquid soap, and hand towels; cabin guests shower in the centrally located Shower House. There are also four hiker dormitories (two for men and two for women), which were built in the 1970s, replacing the four 1925 tent cabins. Each dormitory has 10 beds set up in bunks, a sink, a toilet, and a shower; bedding, towels, and soap are provided. Total capacity for the Ranch is about 90 guests per night. (The dormitories, closed in March 2020 due to COVID social distancing restrictions, remain closed due to the ongoing work on the sewage treatment plant.) The dining hall, now called Phantom Ranch Canteen, serves breakfast and dinner on a strict schedule and requires advance reservations; the Canteen is open to the public during non-meal hours, offering a small variety of items including snacks, beverages, stamps, T-shirts, postcards, headlamps, and first-aid supplies. Additional facilities include the mule corral, a small amphitheater, employee housing, a ranger station (with limited emergency medical services), and a heliport. Cottonwood trees, a few of which date back to the time of Rust's tent camp, line the creek and shade the buildings. Campers from Bright Angel Campground are not allowed to use the Shower House, but may reserve meals at the Canteen. Shortyly before the 2026 flood two the four hiker dorms had been opened. Their ntatus is now in question, along with the entire area, after the flood.

The only modes of access to and from Phantom Ranch are trails (used by both hikers and mules) and the Colorado River. The North Kaibab Trail leads 13.6 miles (21.9 km) to the North Rim. Two trails lead to the South Rim. One is the 9.3-mile (15.0 km) route that crosses the Silver Bridge, follows the River Trail for 2 miles (3.2 km), and then climbs the Bright Angel Trail to Grand Canyon Village. The other is the steeper 7.1-mile (11.4 km) route across the Black Bridge and up the South Kaibab Trail. The two bridges, about 700 metres (770 yd) apart, are the only Colorado River crossings within a several-hundred-mile span.

Phantom Ranch has no official mail service (unlike Supai, Arizona), but concessionaires have traditionally transported letters and postcards by mule. Packages are excluded from this service.

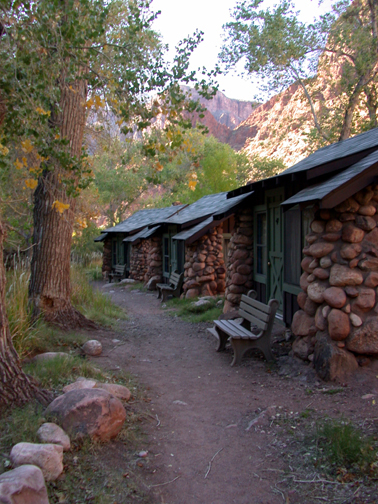
Cabins at Phantom Ranch

== Geography ==
Phantom Ranch's elevation is 2,460 feet (750 m); that is about 4,800 feet (1,500 m) lower than the South Rim and about 5,800 feet (1,800 m) lower than the North Rim.

=== Climate ===
According to the Köppen Climate Classification system, Phantom Ranch has a hot semi-arid climate, abbreviated "BSh" on climate maps.

The average daily high and low temperatures are 106 °F (41 °C)/78 °F (26 °C) during July and 56 °F (13 °C)/36 °F (2 °C) in January. This represents a wide differential from temperatures at the top of the Grand Canyon; at the South Rim, the average daily high and low temperatures are 84 °F (29 °C)/54 °F (12 °C) in July and 41 °F (5 °C)/18 °F (−8 °C) in January. The South Rim averages 58 inches (150 cm) of snow, and Phantom Ranch less than 1 inch (2.5 cm). The riparian zone at the ranch is subject to invasion by non-native species such as tamarix, and volunteers are at times invited to help maintain the original biome by removing them.

The ranch is located at 36°06′18″N 112°05′40″W.

Climate data for Phantom Ranch (1991–2020 normals, extremes 1935–present)
Month	Jan	Feb	Mar	Apr	May	Jun	Jul	Aug	Sep	Oct	Nov	Dec	Year
Record high °F (°C)	73 (23)	91 (33)	93 (34)	106 (41)	111 (44)	119 (48)	120 (49)	120 (49)	114 (46)	103 (39)	87 (31)	77 (25)	120 (49)
Mean maximum °F (°C)	67.3 (19.6)	75.4 (24.1)	85.8 (29.9)	95.5 (35.3)	104.0 (40.0)	111.6 (44.2)	113.8 (45.4)	110.0 (43.3)	104.6 (40.3)	95.5 (35.3)	80.3 (26.8)	67.6 (19.8)	114.5 (45.8)
Mean daily maximum °F (°C)	56.9 (13.8)	63.2 (17.3)	72.7 (22.6)	81.0 (27.2)	90.9 (32.7)	102.0 (38.9)	104.4 (40.2)	100.9 (38.3)	94.5 (34.7)	81.9 (27.7)	67.6 (19.8)	55.9 (13.3)	81.0 (27.2)
Daily mean °F (°C)	46.1 (7.8)	51.5 (10.8)	59.1 (15.1)	66.6 (19.2)	75.7 (24.3)	85.8 (29.9)	89.7 (32.1)	86.5 (30.3)	80.2 (26.8)	68.4 (20.2)	55.6 (13.1)	45.9 (7.7)	67.6 (19.8)
Mean daily minimum °F (°C)	35.2 (1.8)	39.7 (4.3)	45.5 (7.5)	52.2 (11.2)	60.6 (15.9)	69.6 (20.9)	75.1 (23.9)	72.2 (22.3)	65.9 (18.8)	54.9 (12.7)	43.6 (6.4)	35.8 (2.1)	54.2 (12.3)
Mean minimum °F (°C)	29.0 (−1.7)	32.4 (0.2)	36.8 (2.7)	43.3 (6.3)	50.9 (10.5)	61.0 (16.1)	68.8 (20.4)	67.3 (19.6)	58.7 (14.8)	45.6 (7.6)	34.6 (1.4)	29.1 (−1.6)	27.4 (−2.6)
Record low °F (°C)	3 (−16)	21 (−6)	25 (−4)	27 (−3)	32 (0)	50 (10)	60 (16)	58 (14)	48 (9)	37 (3)	25 (−4)	12 (−11)	3 (−16)
Average precipitation inches (mm)	0.99 (25)	0.96 (24)	0.86 (22)	0.43 (11)	0.42 (11)	0.18 (4.6)	0.92 (23)	1.54 (39)	0.94 (24)	0.96 (24)	0.60 (15)	0.83 (21)	9.63 (245)
Average precipitation days (≥ 0.01 inch)	5.6	6.0	5.2	3.6	2.7	1.3	5.5	7.5	5.3	4.0	3.1	4.5	54.3
Source 1: NOAA
Source 2: National Weather Service
