= Trans-Canyon Telephone Line, Grand Canyon National Park =

- U.S. National Register of Historic Places
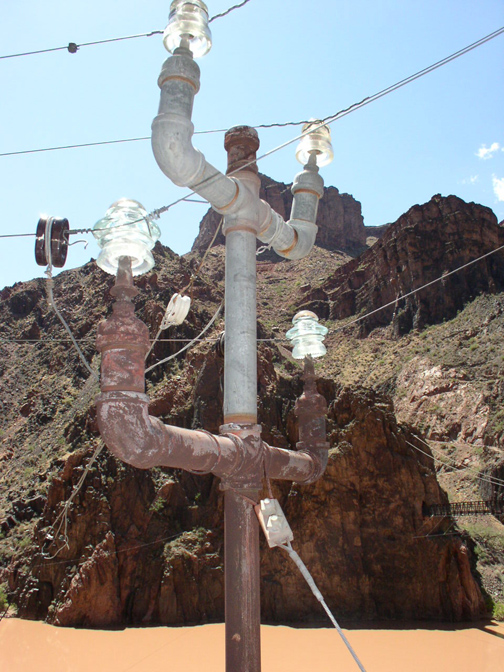

- Location within Arizona Location within the United States
- Nearest city: Grand Canyon, Arizona
- Coordinates: 36°6′36″N 112°5′34″W
- Built: 1934
- Architect: Civilian Conservation Corps; National Park Service
- NRHP reference No.: 86001102
- Added to NRHP: May 13, 1986

The Trans-Canyon Telephone line crossed the Grand Canyon from the South Rim to the North Rim via the Inner Canyon. On the south side of the Canyon, the phone line left the South Rim developed area near Bright Angel Lodge, went down Pipe Creek, and crossed the Colorado River. On the north side, the phone line followed Bright Angel Creek up to the rim to the Wylie Way Tourist Camp before the construction of the Grand Canyon Inn. The line was in place by 1924 and was altered in 1935 and again in 1938-39 by the Civilian Conservation Corps. It has been unchanged since then. Telephone lines were supported using 592 assemblies of 2-inch (5.1 cm) galvanized pipes and fittings, which could be easily transported and assembled with minimal impact to the canyon environment. It was a rare surviving example of open-wire copper-weld technology. The line extended for 18 miles (29 km), paralleling the Bright Angel Trail and the North Kaibab Trail, providing a direct link between the North and South Rims, as well as the Inner Canyon. A spur line ran along the Tonto Trail to the Tipoff.

The line was placed on the National Register of Historic Places on May 13, 1986.

Only small portions of the cable are currently in use after a Digital Subscriber Line (DSL) circuit to Havasupai Garden was disconnected and the signal moved to a Starlink connection.

The National Park Service awarded US Park Ranger Elizabeth "Betsy" Aurnou the 2023 NPS Wright Brothers Aviation Award for her efforts in removing this historic telephone line from the Grand Canyon.

== See also ==
- Architects of the National Park Service
