= O'Neill Butte =

Landform in the Grand Canyon, Arizona

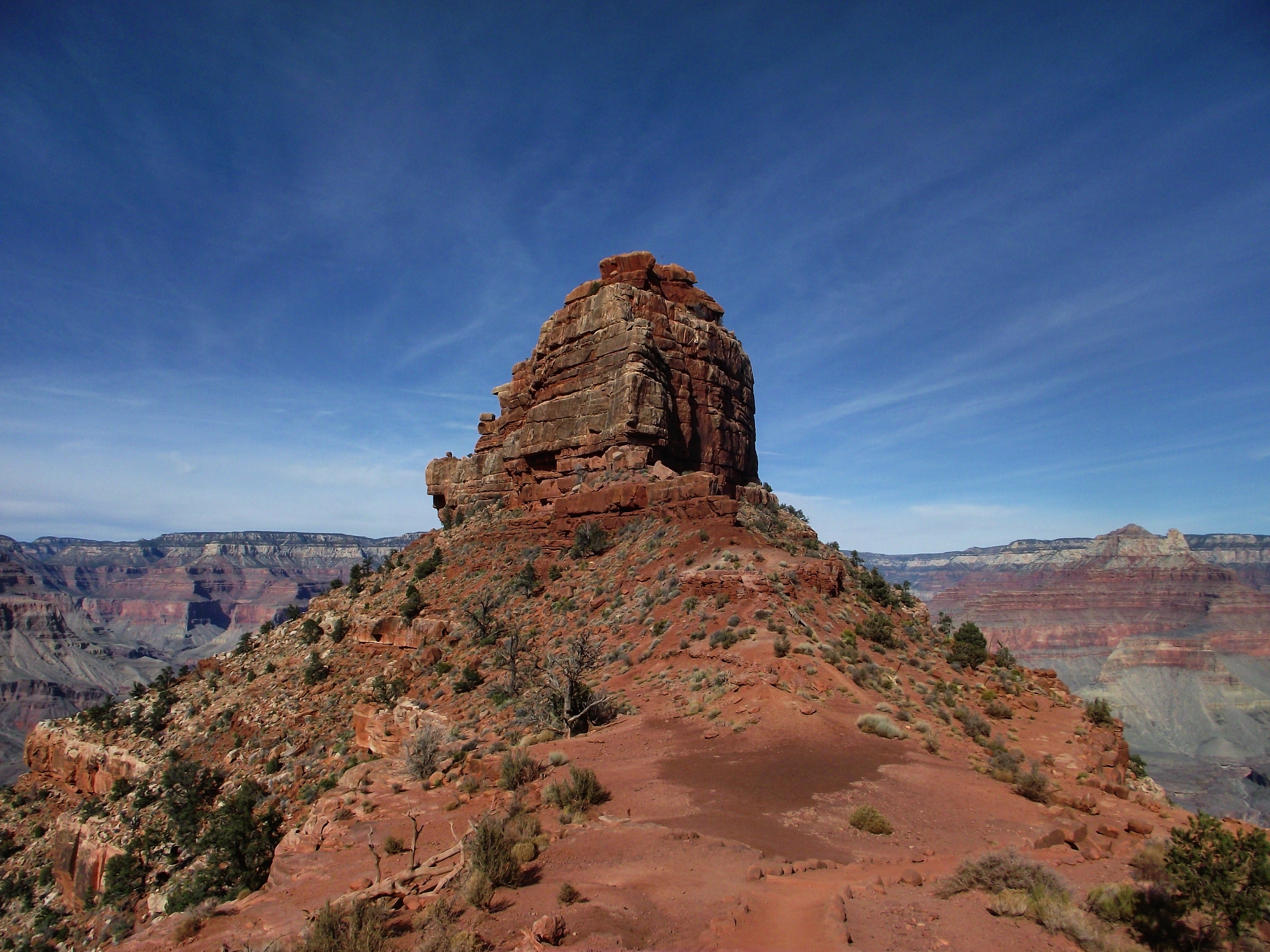
- South aspect, from Cedar Ridge

Highest point
- Elevation: 6,071 ft (1,850 m)
- Prominence: 311 ft (95 m)
- Parent peak: Zoroaster Temple (7,123 ft)
- Isolation: 4.17 mi (6.71 km)
- Coordinates: 36°04′14″N 112°05′26″W

Geography
- Location within Arizona Location within the United States
- Country: United States
- State: Arizona
- County: Coconino
- Protected area: Grand Canyon National Park
- Parent range: Coconino Plateau; Colorado Plateau
- Topo map: USGS Phantom Ranch

Geology
- Rock type(s): limestone, shale, sandstone

Climbing
- Easiest route: class 5.0 to 5.9 routes

O'Neill Butte is a 6,071-foot (1,850 m)-elevation summit located in the Grand Canyon, in Coconino County of northern Arizona, United States. It is situated 2.5 miles (4.0 km) east-northeast of Grand Canyon Village, one mile (1.6 km) northeast of Mather Point, and one mile immediately northwest of Yaki Point. Cedar Ridge connects O'Neill Butte with Yaki Point on the South Rim. Topographic relief is significant as O'Neill Butte rises 3,600 feet (1,100 m) above the Colorado River in two miles (3.2 km). Access to this prominence is via the South Kaibab Trail which traverses the east slope of the peak. According to the Köppen climate classification system, O'Neill Butte is located in a cold semi-arid climate zone.

== Geology ==
The summit block of O'Neill Butte is composed of Permian Esplanade Sandstone, which is the uppermost member of the Pennsylvanian-Permian Supai Group. The rest of the Supai Group overlays Mississippian Redwall Limestone. The cliff-forming Redwall overlays the Cambrian Tonto Group, and below that Paleoproterozoic Vishnu Basement Rocks at river level in Granite Gorge. Precipitation runoff from O'Neill Butte drains north to the Colorado River via Pipe Creek (west aspect) and Cremation Creek (east).

== History ==
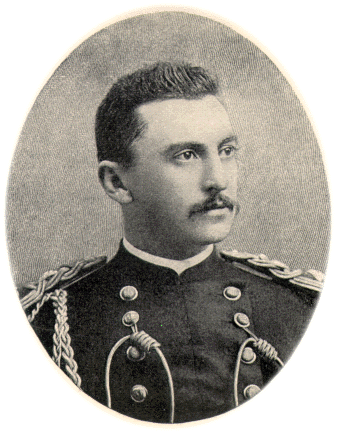
Buckey O'Neill

This feature is named for William Owen "Buckey" O'Neill (1860–1898), an Arizona Territory politician, who died as a captain of Theodore Roosevelt's Rough Riders at the Battle of San Juan Hill. O'Neill did some prospecting in the Grand Canyon in 1890, and also figured prominently in bringing the railroad to the canyon's South Rim. This landform's toponym was officially adopted in 1906 by the U.S. Board on Geographic Names.

== Gallery ==
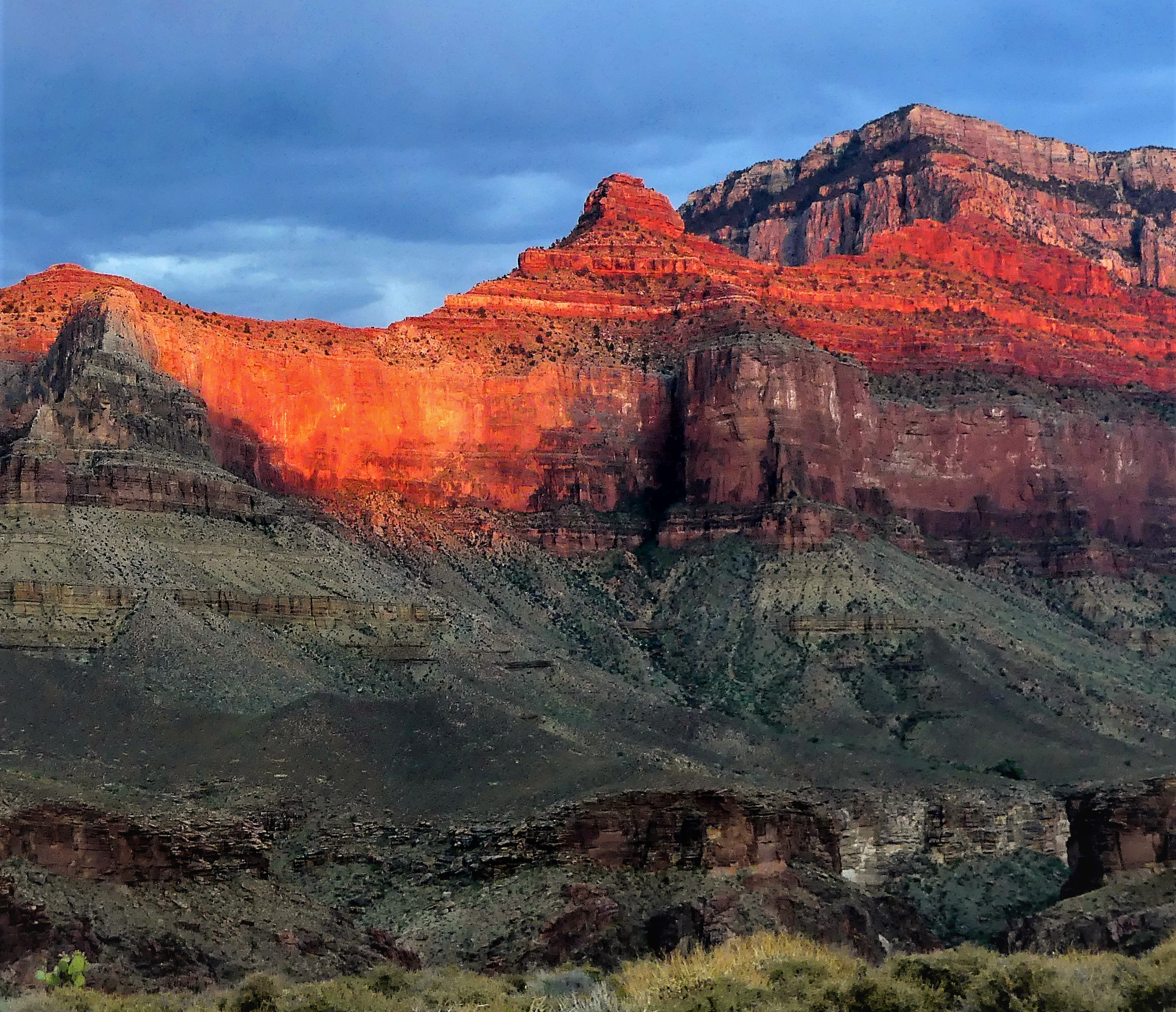
O'Neill Butte centered with Yaki Point upper right. From northwest.

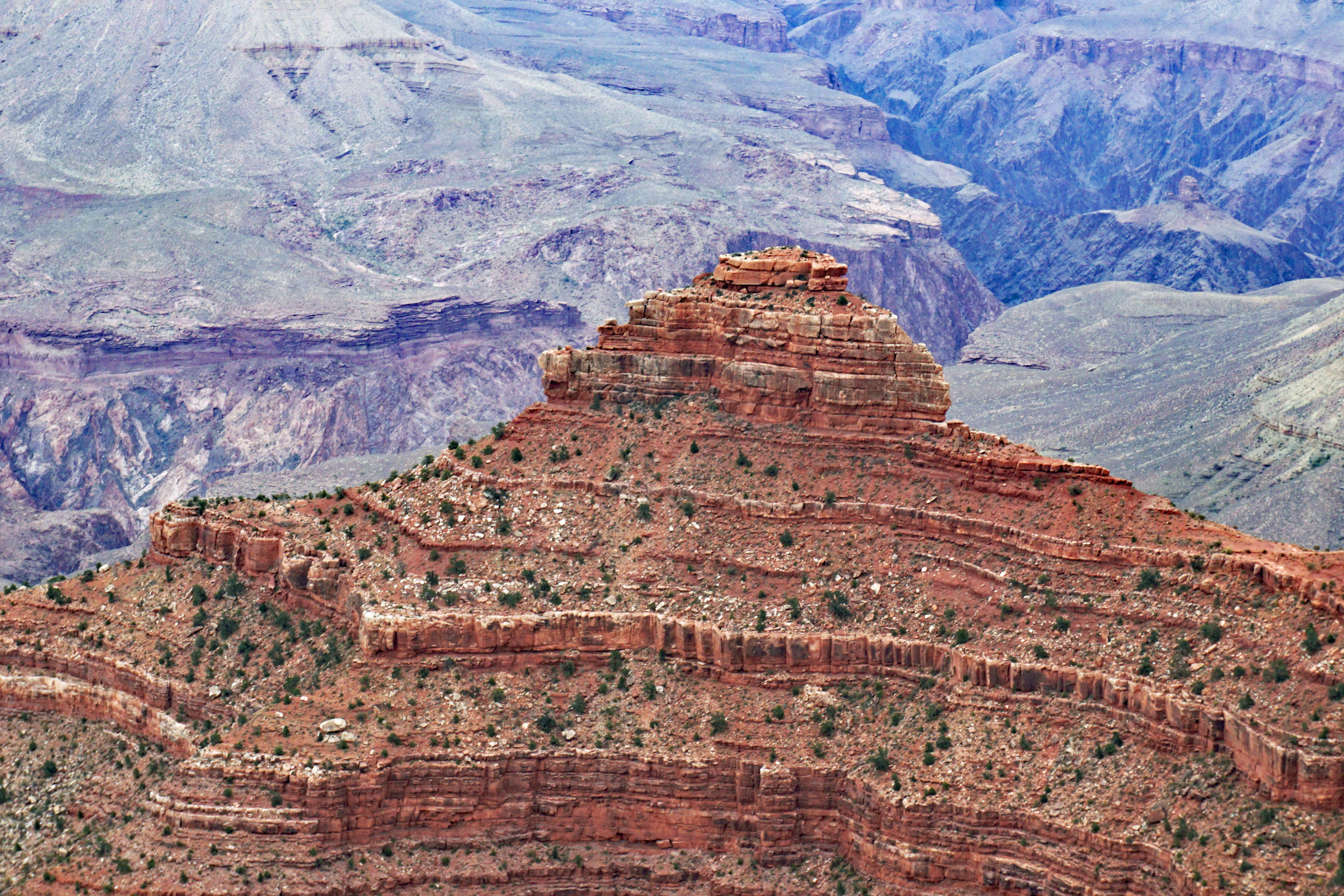
O'Neill Butte from Yavapai Point

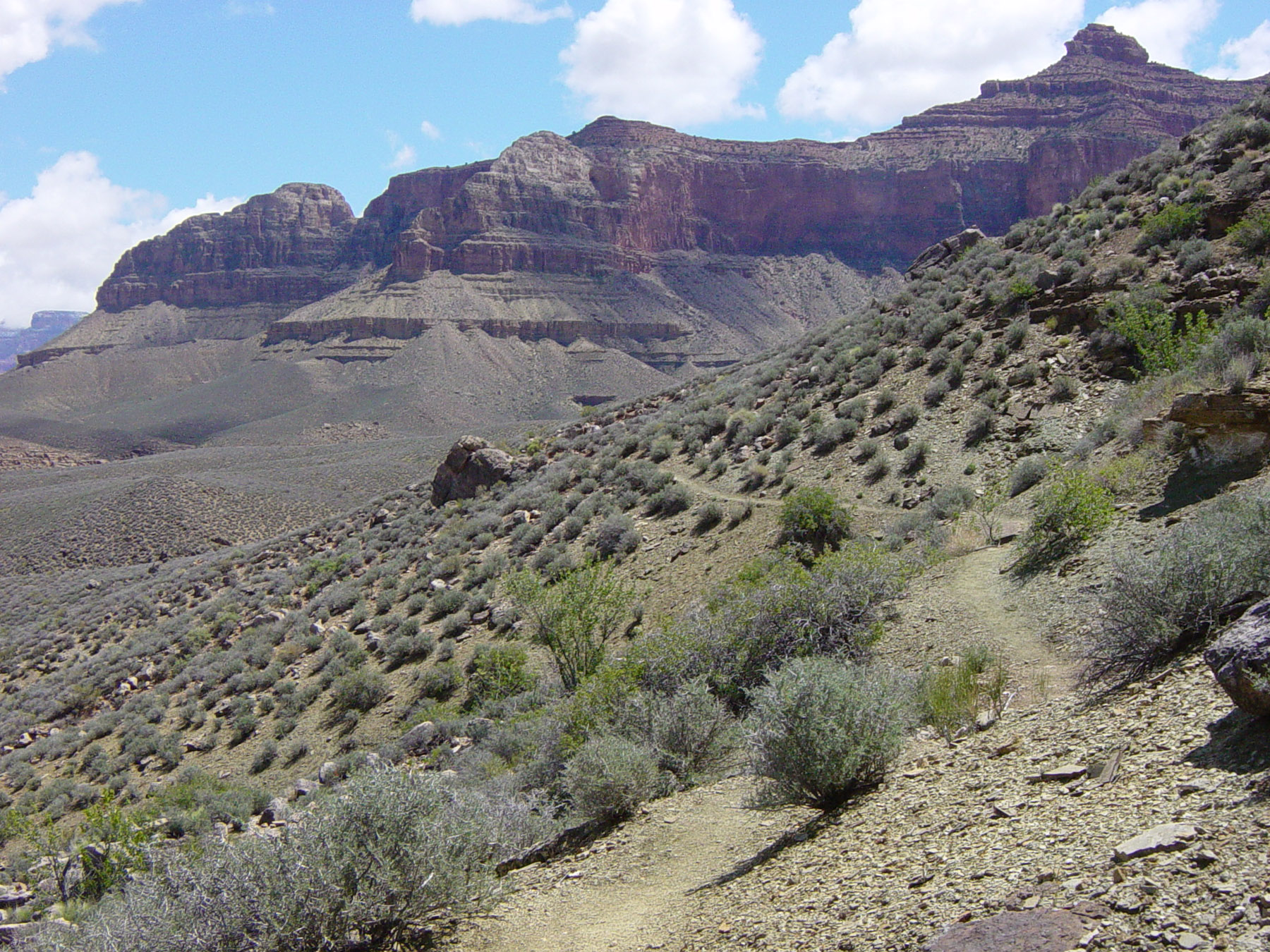
West aspect of O'Neill Butte (upper right) from Tonto Trail

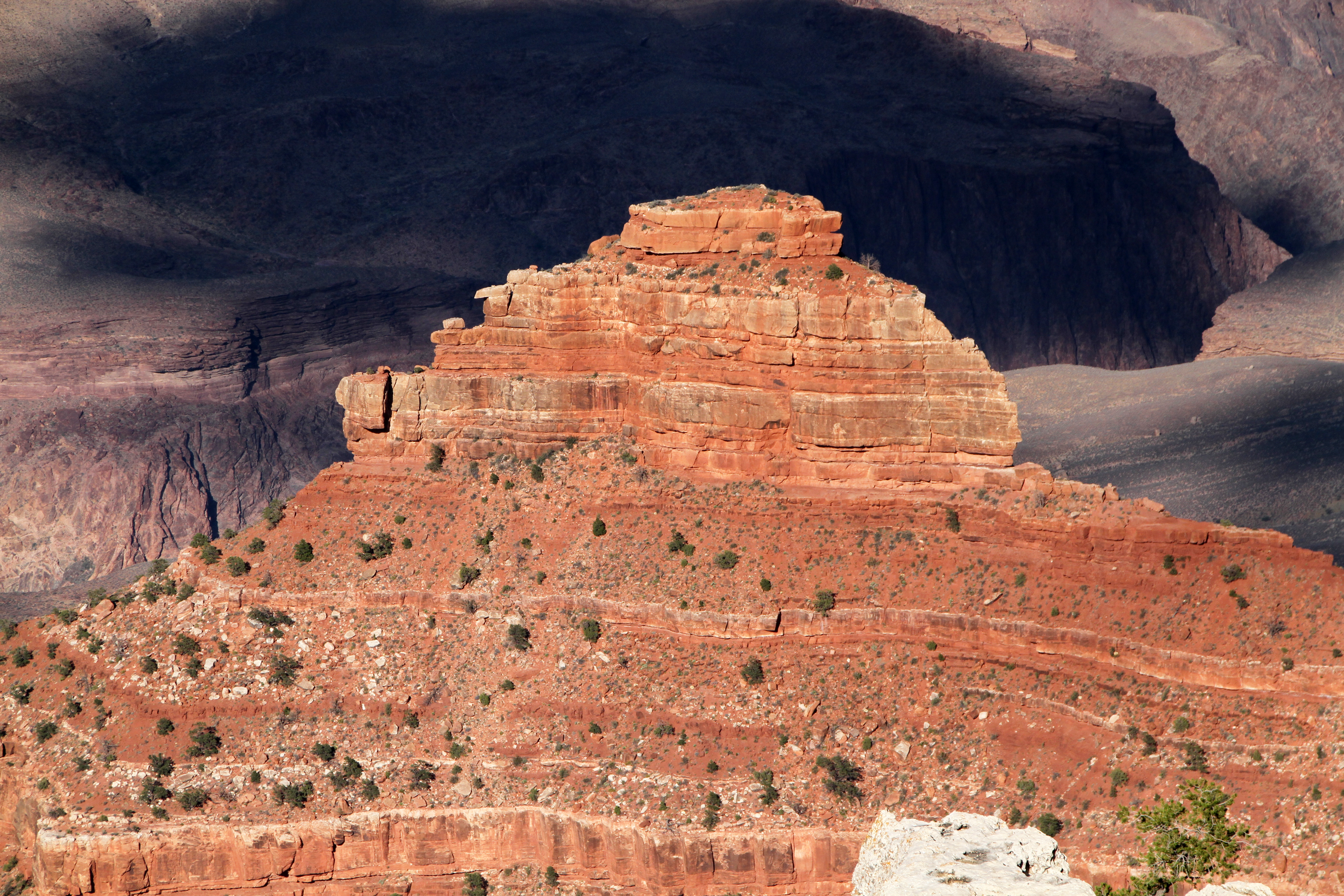

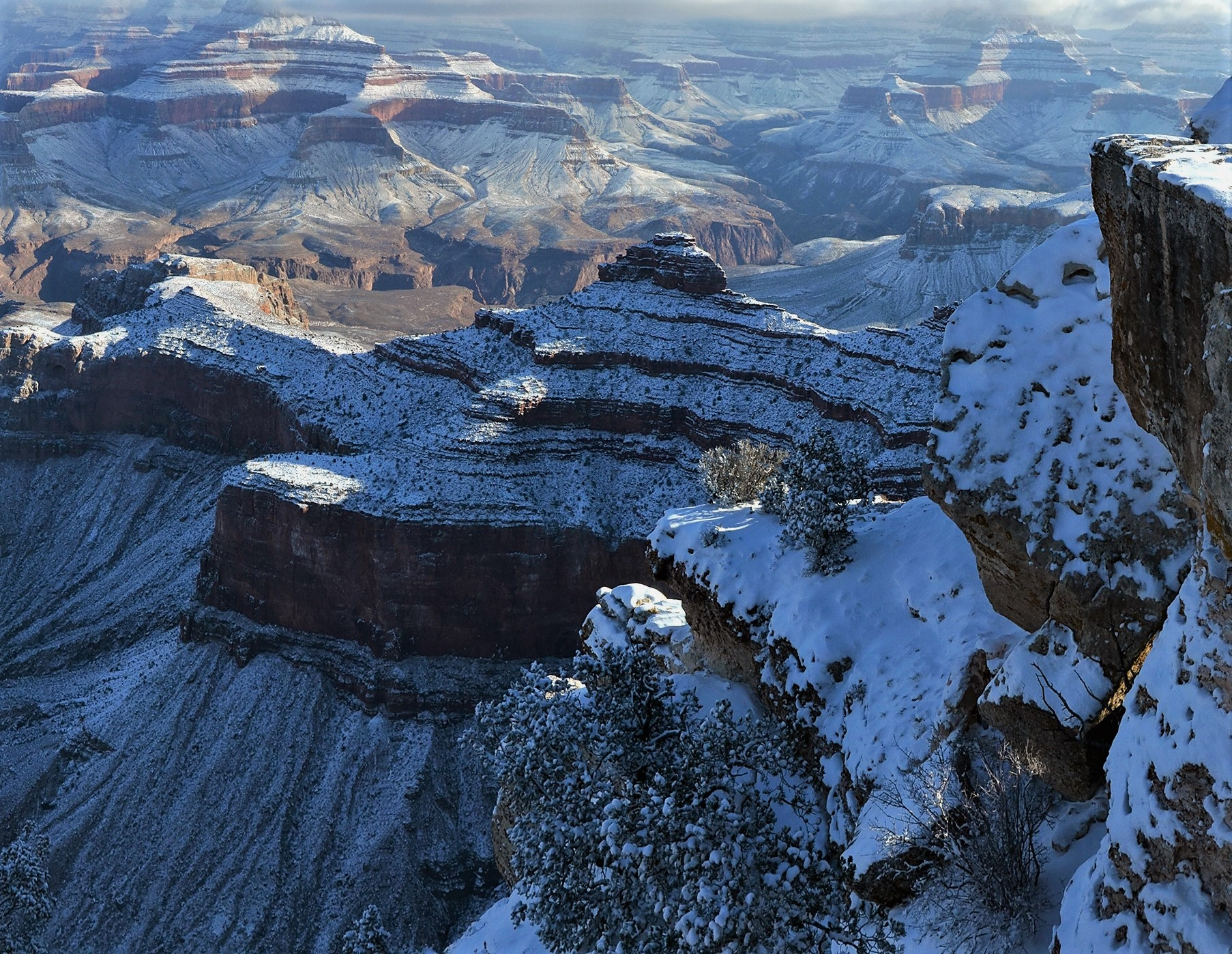
O'Neill Butte from Mather Point in winter

== See also ==
- Geology of the Grand Canyon area
