= Eden, Arizona =

Community in Graham County, Arizona

Eden is a small unincorporated community in Graham County, Arizona, United States. It is part of the Safford Micropolitan Statistical Area. Eden has a ZIP Code of 85535; according to the 2020–2024 American Community Survey 5-year estimates, ZIP Code Tabulation Area (ZCTA) 85535 had a population of 42.

The first settlement at Eden was made in 1881. The community was named after the Garden of Eden in the Hebrew Bible.

== Geography ==
Eden is located at 32°57′40″N 109°53′43″W, at an elevation of approximately 2756 feet above sea level.

== Features ==
The area hosted the Indian Hot Springs Hotel until February 2008, when it burned down. The mansion was rumored to host the likes of the Rolling Stones on more than one occasion. The mansion had a 70' × 270' pool, the largest ever in Graham County.

== In film ==
Director Jaymes Thompson filmed The Gay Bed and Breakfast of Terror at the Eden mansion.

== See also ==
- Indian Hot Springs
