= John J. Thompson (settler) =

- Born: 21 April 1841; County Londonderry, Ireland
- Died: 5 March 1917 (aged 75); Indian Gardens, Arizona, U.S.
- Burial place: Schuerman Red Rock Cemetery, Sedona, Arizona, U.S.

John James Thompson (21 April 1841 – 5 March 1917) was an Irish emigrant to Arizona. He was the first pioneering settler of Oak Creek Canyon, near Sedona, Arizona, United States.

== Early life ==
Thompson was born in County Londonderry, Ireland, in 1841.

== Emigration ==
Thompson's family left Ireland around 1852, arriving in New York. They made their way west in search of work, initially settling in Texas. In his early 20s, Thompson enlisted in the Confederate States Army and served in the Civil War.

== Career ==
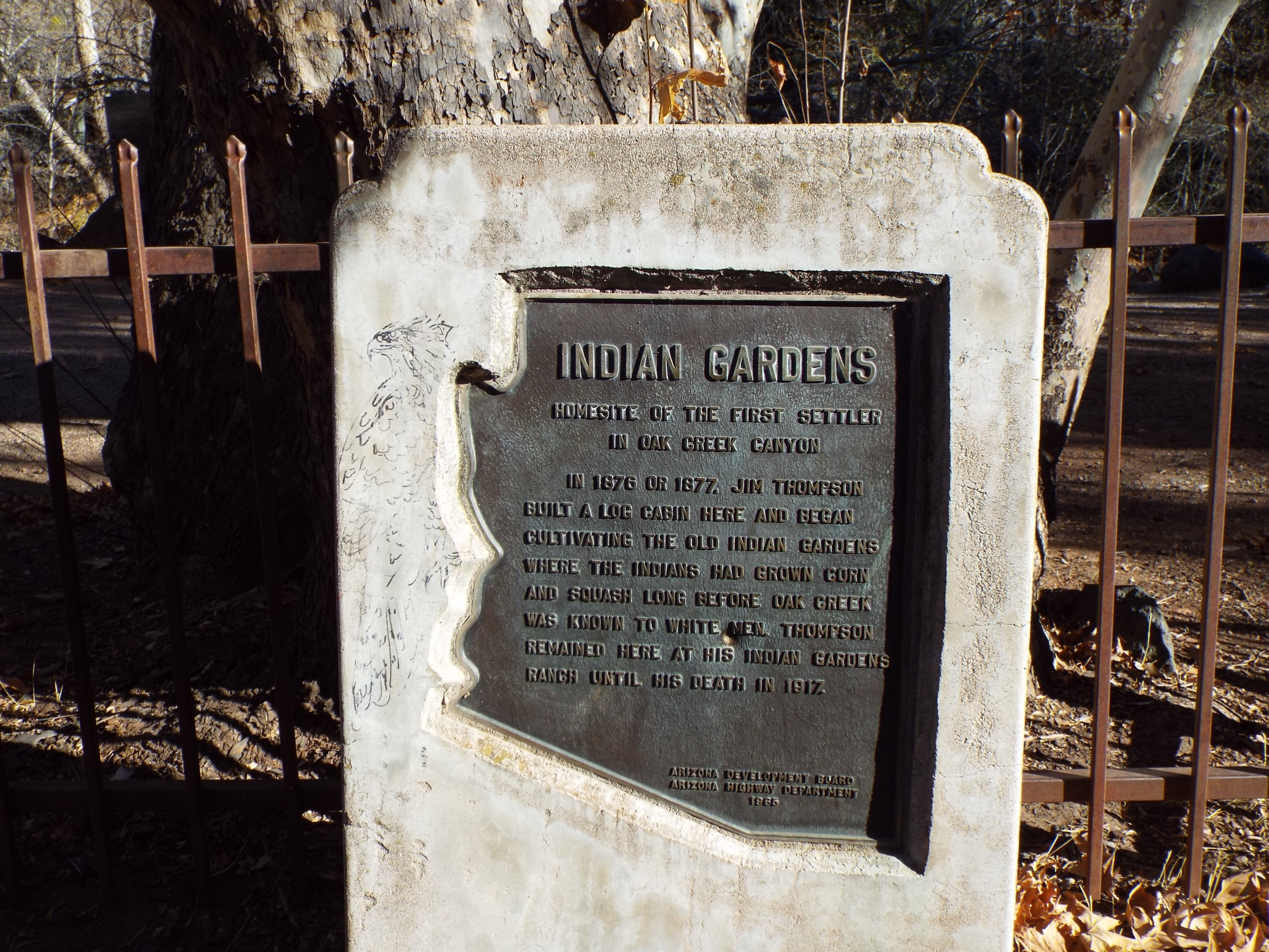
Marker at Indian Gardens

In 1876, aged 35, Thompson became the first permanent white settler of Indian Gardens, Arizona, just north of Sedona, having discovered melon, corn and squash gardens along the banks of Oak Creek. Thompson travelled to Prescott, then the capital of the Arizona territory, to make a claim on the land on which he had recently arrived. He then crossed the mountains to Fort Verde and spoke to the soldiers about removing the Tonto Apaches who were farming that land. They agreed, allowing Thompson to build his homestead via the Homestead Act of 1862.

A 3-mile (4.8 km) hiking trail, named the Jim Thompson Trail, follows the original road he built in 1887, linking his home in Oak Creek Canyon to Sedona. The trail opened in 1998.

== Personal life ==
Thompson married Margaret Parlee James, with whom he had ten known children between 1882 and 1911.

== Death ==
Thompson died in the Village of Oak Creek in 1917, aged 75. He was interred in Schuerman Red Rock Cemetery in Sedona. His widow survived him by nineteen years and was buried beside her husband.
