= Indian Gardens Cafe and Market =

Historic building in Oak Creek Canyon, Arizona

- Pictured in 2026, with Wilson Mountain in the background

General information
- Location: 3951 State Route 89A, Indian Gardens, Arizona, United States
- Coordinates: 34.9101917°N 111.7287453°W
- Completed: 1948 (78 years ago)

Website
- https://www.indiangardens.com

Indian Gardens Cafe and Market, in Indian Gardens, Arizona, is the oldest continually operated general store in the Sedona area. Located on Arizona State Route 89A (SR 89A), around 3.5 miles (5.6 km) northeast of uptown Sedona, it was established in 1948.

Historical accounts state the building of the store was completed in 1948 by Frank Jackson and Ed Black, during a heavy winter snowstorm. Jackson ran the business with his sons, Wes and Skeeter (1936–1988). It was purchased by the Garland family in 1984, with Daniel and Monica Garland taking over in 2011. The current owners are Caleb Schiff and James Worden, who purchased it in 2020.

In 2020, Yelp included the cafe on its list of the Top 100 Places to Eat in the United States.

Between June and July 2026, the market closed after a pocket fire near Oak Creek Canyon forced the closure of SR 89A.

== Gallery ==
Interior

Back patio, at the foot of Wilson Mountain
