= Indian Hot Springs =

Thermal spring system and historical hot spring hotel resort

- Holladay Hot Springs; Eden Hot Springs
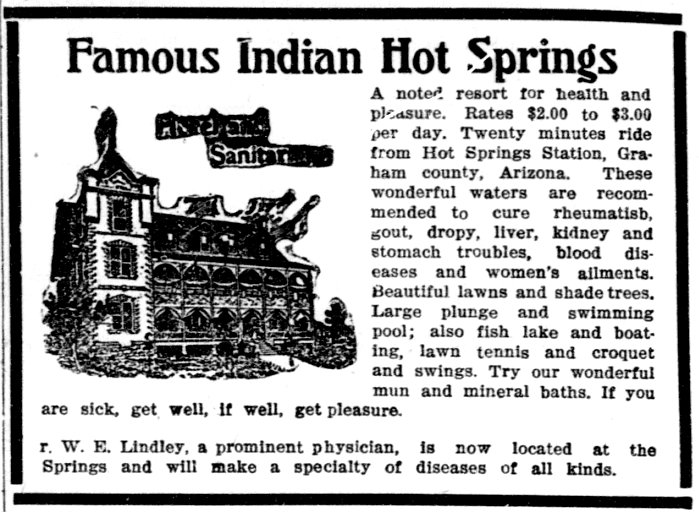
- Advertisement for Indian Hot Springs, 1910

- Location within Arizona
- Interactive map of Indian Hot Springs
- Location: near Eden, Arizona
- Coordinates: 32°59′54″N 109°54′02″W
- Elevation: 2,792 ft (851 m)
- Type: Hot spring
- Discharge: 1.5 million gallons per day
- Temperature: 118 °F (48 °C)

Indian Hot Springs, also known as Holladay Hot Springs and Eden Hot Springs, is a geothermal spring system located near Eden, Arizona in the former settlement of Indian Hot Springs, Arizona.

== History ==
The hot springs were used by local Indigenous people before European and American settlers populated the area. During the late 1870s Ben Gardner developed the site into a commercial property. Gardner developed the springs by building soaking pools and a tent encampment that were used by soldiers from nearby Fort Thomas. Starting in 1885, the site became popular due to the recently constructed Gila Valley, Globe and Northern Railway which stopped in nearby Pima, Arizona.

John Holladay and his son purchased the site from Gardener in 1888, and renamed the 200-acre property Holladay Hot Springs. The Holladays ran the bathhouse and also sold lime. In May, 1899, the property was sold to John and Andrew Alexander, two brothers who ran the Geronimo-Globe stagecoach and owned a store in Fort Thomas. The Alexander brothers renamed the property Indian Hot Springs, built 60 cottage-tents and a kitchen and dining hall. They advertised the resort for its "healing waters as a cure for rheumatism", and it became a popular tourist destination.

The Graham Guardian newspaper reported in 1901 that the hot springs held "curative properties" that would be "known all over the civilized world". A three-story, 30-room hotel was built the Alexanders in 1903 to replace the tents and cabin-tents. In 1905 a swimming pool was constructed at the hot springs; it was the largest in Arizona at the time and measured 255 ft (78 m) long by 70 ft (21 m) feet wide.

In 1914, the Arizona Record newspaper out of Globe, Arizona reported that the hot springs resort excelled "in efficiency [of] any of the foreign spas". That same year, Burton Frasher, a photographer from California set up a commercial photographic studio at the settlement, and created a series of images of the hot springs as well as many other scenic cultural and geological sites in the Southwest.

In September 1916, Henry and Rose Hill purchased the property, and lengthened the hot springs swimming pool by 15 ft (4.6 m), added a diving board and private bathhouses. The Hills sold the property to Frank Farrell in 1920 who co-owned it with several partners.

In 1964, Jerry Hancock purchased the hot springs property; his wife Irene ran the swimming pool. In 1966 the pool was shut down by the Arizona health department due to the fact that the hot spring water was unchlorinated and deemed unsafe.

During the 1970s and beyond, the hot springs property had a colorful history of various owners over the years that included the Earth First environmental activist group, another group that called themselves Ruckus, and later a group that included Mick Jagger who first visited the resort in 1982 with the Rolling Stones.

In 1998, Royce and Regina Richardson, a gun-carrying well-to-do couple from Phoenix took the hot springs property by force, evicting the caretaker Wesley Prophet. The property was owned by the Indian Springs Ranch Corporation at the time. The Richardsons intended to use the springs property as a private retreat, and to establish a business venture that included growing medicinal herbs and building a bottling plant. The following year they were charged with forcible entry without written authorization.

In February 2002, Earth First held a conference at the site which was crashed in the evening of February 19 by Ruckus, a competing environmental group. A doctor was shot and killed during the skuffle, and the gunman later committed suicide while being pursued by the police. The 49-year old shooter was Jonathan Bailey from England, who shot Dr. James A. Dassault with a .9mm Glock pistol before killing himself with a shotgun.

On February 28, 2008, the 105-year-old historic hot springs hotel burned, all that was left were a few masonry walls.

== Location ==
The Hot Spring lies about 153 mi (246 km) southeast of Phoenix, the state capital of Arizona. Eden is around 2.7 mi (4.3 km) away, which is the closest town. Safford Regional Airport, located around 22.4 mi (36.0 km) from the hot spring, is the closest airport. Also, this hot spring is close to the Gila River.

== Water profile ==
The hot springs located at Indian Hot Springs emerge from the ground at an average temperature of 118 °F (48 °C).

In 1916, the daily flow from the springs measured 1.5 million gallons per day.

== See also ==
- List of hot springs in the United States
- List of hot springs in the world
