= Rim Trail =

Grand Canyon hiking trail

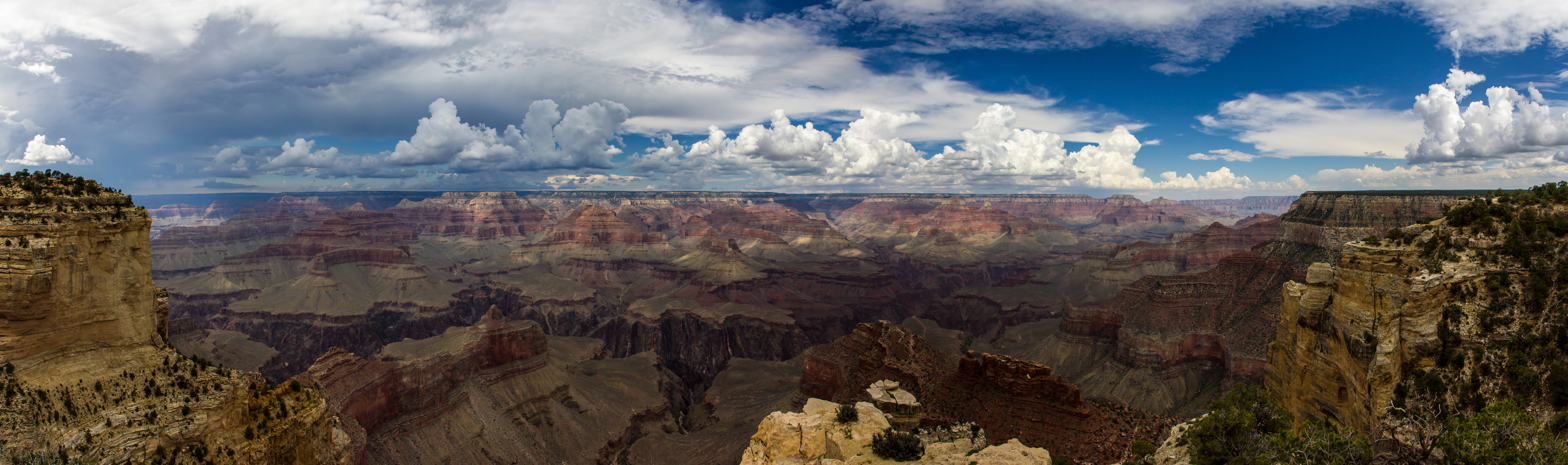
- View from the Hermits Rest the end of the Rim Trail
- Use: Hiking
- Sights: Grand Canyon

The Rim Trail is a hiking trail located on the South Rim of the Grand Canyon National Park, located in the U.S. state of Arizona. It is a 13 miles (21 km) trail between the South Kaibab Trailhead west to Hermit's Rest. It is also where former Major League Baseball player Charlie Haeger was found dead on October 3, 2020, which happened to be a day after his ex-girlfriend was found dead in Scottsdale, Arizona

== See also ==
- The Grand Canyon
- List of trails in Grand Canyon National Park
