= South Kaibab Trail =

Grand Canyon hiking trail

Coordinates: 36.0529°N 112.08304°W

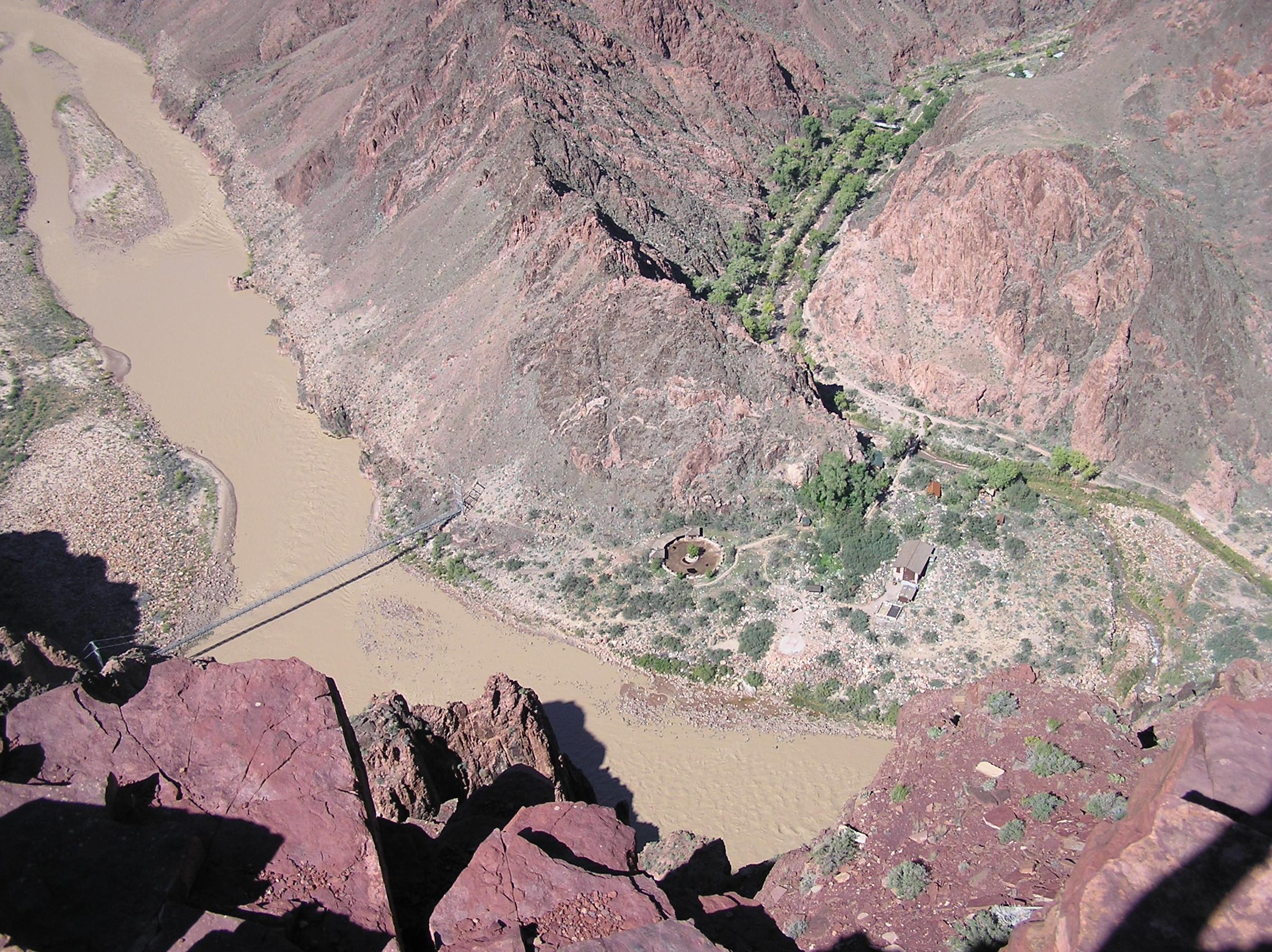
- Colorado River and Phantom Ranch from lower South Kaibab Trail
- Length: 7.1 mi (11.4 km)
- Location: Grand Canyon National Park, Arizona, United States
- Trailheads: Colorado River; Yaki Point, Grand Canyon South Rim
- Use: Hiking; Stock (Horse and Mule Use)
- Elevation change: 4,780 ft (1,460 m)
- Highest point: South Rim, 7,200 ft (2,200 m)
- Lowest point: Colorado River, 2,420 ft (740 m)
- Difficulty: Strenuous
- Season: Year Round
- Sights: Grand Canyon; Colorado River
- Hazards: Severe Weather; Overexertion; Dehydration

The South Kaibab Trail is a hiking trail in Grand Canyon National Park, located in the U.S. state of Arizona. Unlike the Bright Angel Trail which also begins at the south rim of the Grand Canyon and leads to the Colorado River, the South Kaibab Trail follows a ridge out to Skeleton Point allowing for 360-degree views of the canyon.

== Access and description ==
The trailhead for the South Kaibab Trail is located off of the Yaki Point Road, which is closed to private vehicles. The trailhead can be accessed via either the Rim Trail or the free Grand Canyon National Park shuttle bus. From the trailhead, the trail heads north. Hikers begin with a steep descent through the Grand Canyon's upper rock layers: the Kaibab Limestone and Toroweap Formation. At about 1/2 mile one can observe an excellent example of a pustule dome. Here a small deposit of less dense more buoyant evaporite has punctured through a layer of harder limestone above. Through the first ¾ mile, the trail cuts through the eastern side of Pipe Creek Canyon until Ooh Aah Point, where the canyon walls turn around Yaki Point and the view of the eastern canyon opens up. The point is named after a common reaction to the view.

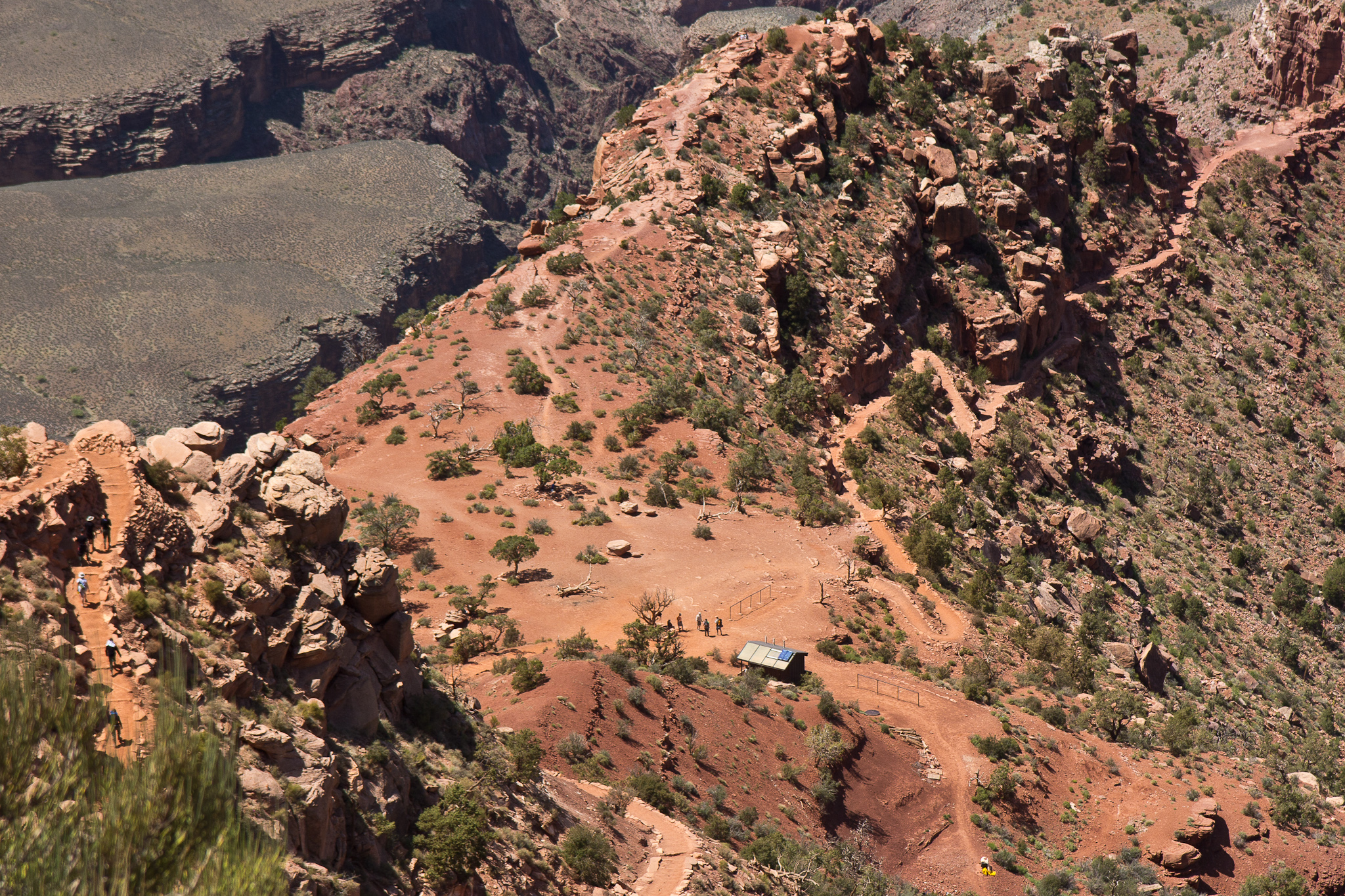
Cedar Ridge as seen from Ooh Aah Point

From Ooh Aah Point the trail turns around a few switchbacks in a natural break in the Coconino Sandstone until Cedar Ridge, where the trail begins to level off slightly. Cedar Ridge has toilet facilities and offers a place for hikers and mule trains to rest. Below here, the trail continues north around the east site of a prominent Supai sandstone tower named O'Neill Butte, descending gradually through the Hermit Shale and Supai Group to Skeleton Point, three miles (4.8 km) from the trailhead. After Skeleton Point, the trail begins a sharp descent through a natural break in the Redwall Limestone. Despite the name, the natural color of the rock is light beige or gray. The trail cuts to the west of the point where hikers can get a view of Phantom Ranch, then quickly back to the east side of the point. There are numerous switchbacks to descend the 1,200 feet (370 m) through the Redwall Limestone, Muav Limestone, and Bright Angel Shale to the junction with the Tonto Trail, 4½ miles from the trailhead.

Colorado River below the Tipoff

A sign marks the trail junction, which has toilet facilities. The Tonto Trail heads west towards Havasupai Gardens, and east towards Horseshoe Mesa and Hance Rapids. About ¼ mile past the junction is a point called the Tipoff, where an emergency phone is located on the east side of the trail. After the Tipoff the trail makes its final steep descent to the bottom of the canyon, through the Tapeats Sandstone and Vishnu Schist. This section is the steepest of the South Kaibab Trail at an average of 22%. Six miles from the trailhead, there is a junction with the River Trail at its eastern terminus. One-half mile past the junction, there is a tunnel that leads to the Black Suspension Bridge crossing the Colorado River. Mule trips from the south rim cross this bridge except when it is closed to traffic. The other crossing of the Colorado is about ¾ downstream on the Silver Suspension Bridge, accessible from the River Trail.

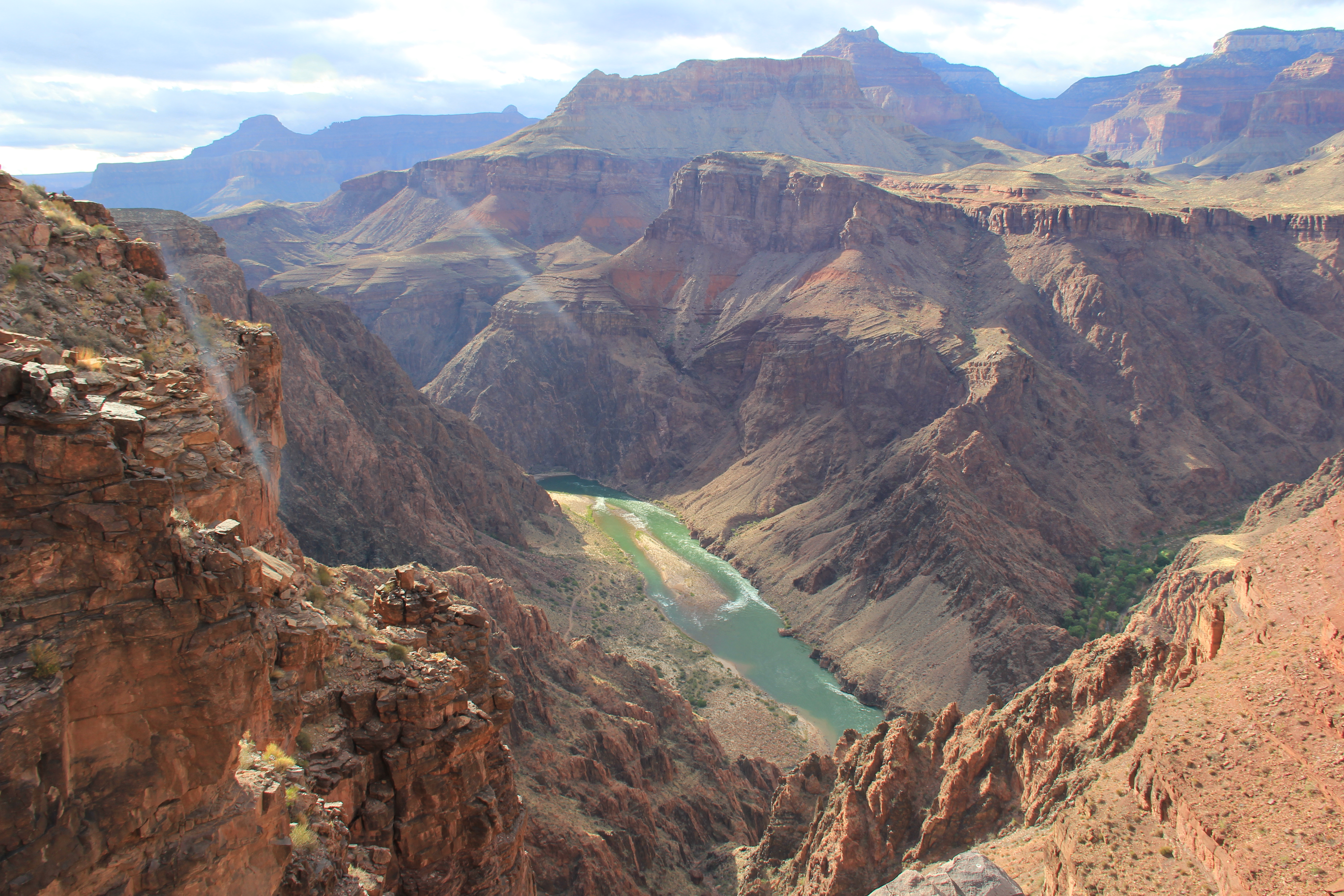
Colorado River view from South Kaibab Trail

On the north site of the river the trail turns westward and descends slightly. There is a spur that leads to Boat Beach on the Colorado River, just downstream from the black bridge. About ½ mile past the bridge is the junction with the River Trail and North Kaibab Trail, marking the official end on the South Kaibab Trail seven miles (11 km) from the trailhead. There is a restroom and water spigot at the junction. The Bright Angel Campground is located just past here, and Phantom Ranch is about ½ mile past the campground.

Mileages and features along South Kaibab Trail
Distance (mi)	Elv (ft)	Location	Connecting trails	Toilet	Water	Phone
0	7260	Trailhead, near Yaki Point	Rim Trail; Arizona Trail	Portable		Pay phone
0.9	6600	Ooh Aah Point				
1.5	6060	Cedar Ridge		Composting		
3	5200	Skeleton Point				
4.4	4010	Trail junction	Tonto Trail	Composting		
4.6	3870	The Tipoff				Emergency
6.7	2600	Black Suspension Bridge	River Trail			
7.1	2480	Bright Angel Campground	River Trail; North Kaibab Trail	Septic	Treated	Pay phones (at Phantom Ranch and River Ranger Station)

=== Part of Arizona Trail ===
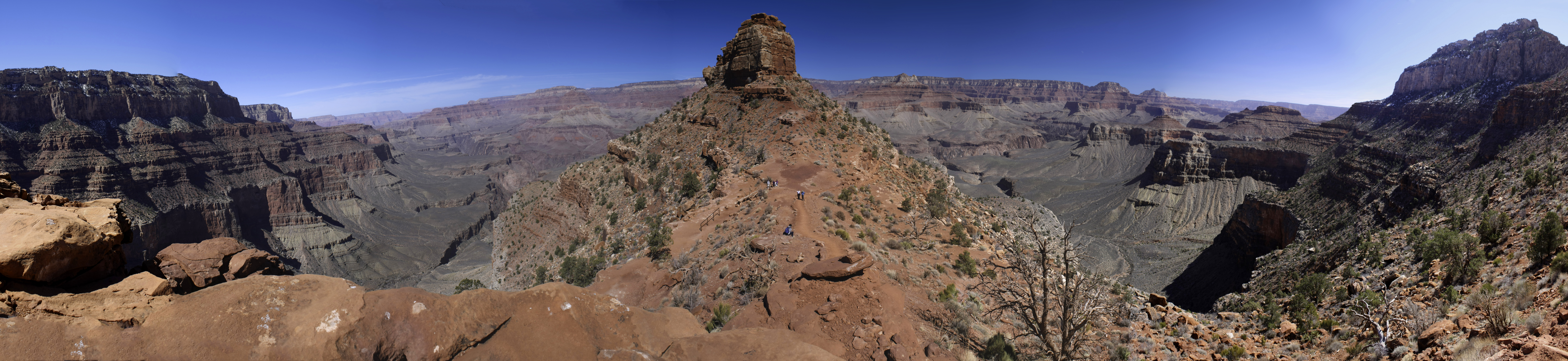
A panoramic view as seen from the South Kaibab Trail, O'Neill Butte centered.

The South Kaibab Trail is also part of the Arizona Trail system, crossing the state of Arizona from Mexico to Utah. The thru-trail continues north from here along the North Kaibab Trail.

=== Condition ===
Grand Canyon National Park categorizes the South Kaibab Trail as a corridor trail. With this designation it receives regular maintenance and patrols by park rangers.

=== Water availability ===
Water is available, along with restrooms, at the trailhead. Water is not available at any point along the South Kaibab Trail, except on the north side of the Colorado River. Treated water is only available at the Bright Angel Campground and Phantom Ranch. All water found from natural sources must be filtered, treated, or boiled prior to consuming.

=== Camping ===
Hikers may only camp at the Bright Angel Campground, where they can stay overnight with a permit issued by the Grand Canyon National Park Backcountry Information Center. Use of the campground overnight is regulated by the National Park Service, and they call for a maximum number of groups (7 to 11 people) and parties (1 to 6 people), as well as a maximum total number of persons. Wood and charcoal fires are not permitted; camp stoves only.

Overnight camping areas near River Trail
Area	Name	Type	Group(s)		Parties	Max People
CBG	Bright Angel	Campground	2	and	31	90

Requests are taken beginning on the 1st day of the month, up to four months before the requested first night of camping. Permits are also available on a first-come, first-served basis from the park's Backcountry Information Center three months out.

=== Hazards ===
Hazards hikers can encounter along the South Kaibab Trail include dehydration, sudden rainstorms, lightning, bootpacked ice, flash flooding, loose footing, rockfall, encounters with wildlife, and extreme heat. At the Colorado River, additional hazards include hypothermia (due to the river's consistently cold temperatures), trauma (due to collisions with boulders in rapids), and drowning.

== See also ==
- List of trails in Grand Canyon National Park
- Geology of the Grand Canyon area
