= Bright Angel Trail =

Grand Canyon hiking trail

Coordinates: 36.05743°N 112.14284°W

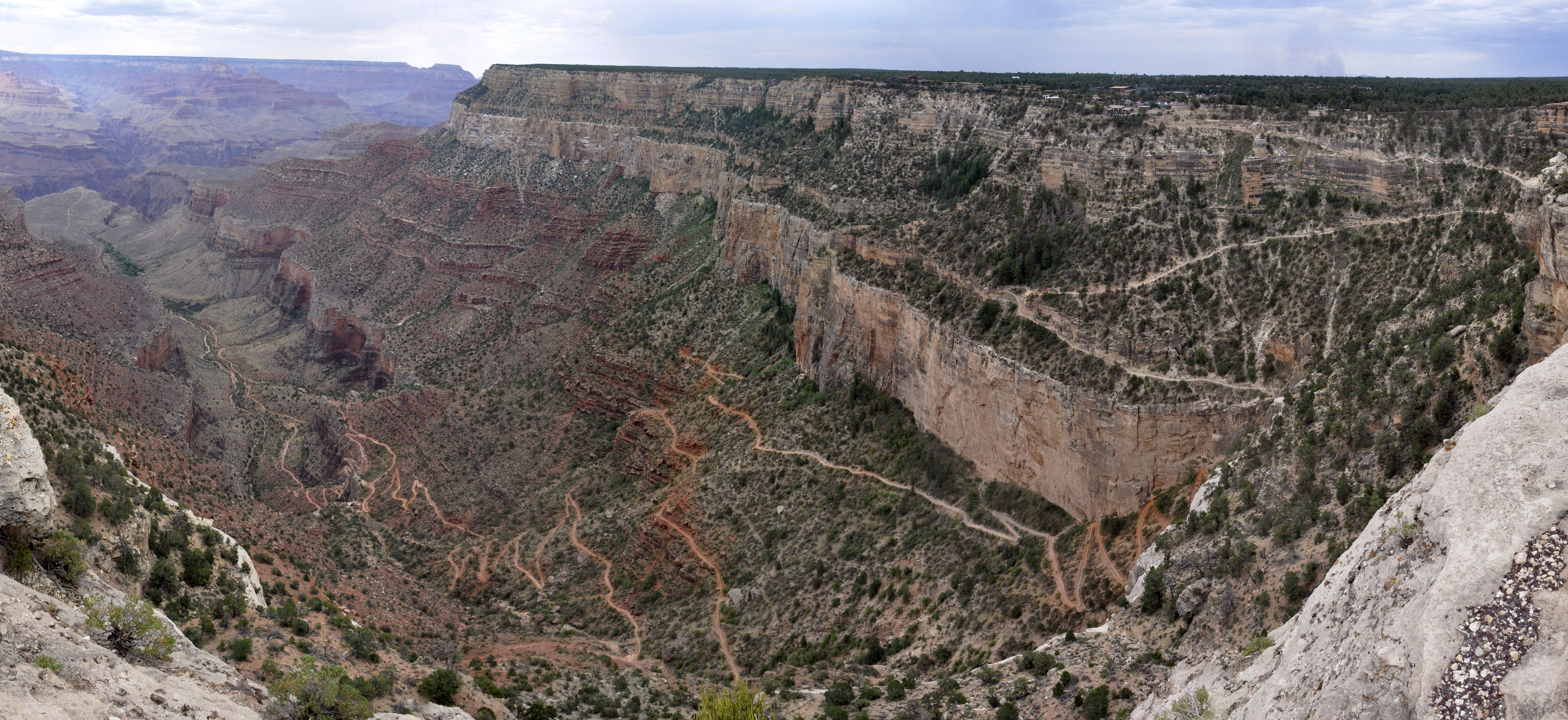
- Majority of the upper part of Bright Angel trail visible from the canyon rim.
- Length: 8.0 mi (12.9 km); 9.9 mi (15.9 km) to Phantom Ranch via River Trail
- Location: Grand Canyon National Park, Arizona, United States
- Trailheads: Phantom Ranch; Grand Canyon (South Rim)
- Use: Hiking
- Elevation change: 4,380 ft (1,340 m)
- Highest point: South Rim, 6,860 ft (2,090 m)
- Lowest point: Colorado River, 2,480 ft (760 m)
- Difficulty: Strenuous
- Season: All year
- Sights: Grand Canyon; Colorado River
- Hazards: Severe Weather; Overexertion; Dehydration

The Bright Angel Trail is a hiking trail located in Grand Canyon National Park in the U.S. state of Arizona.

== Description ==
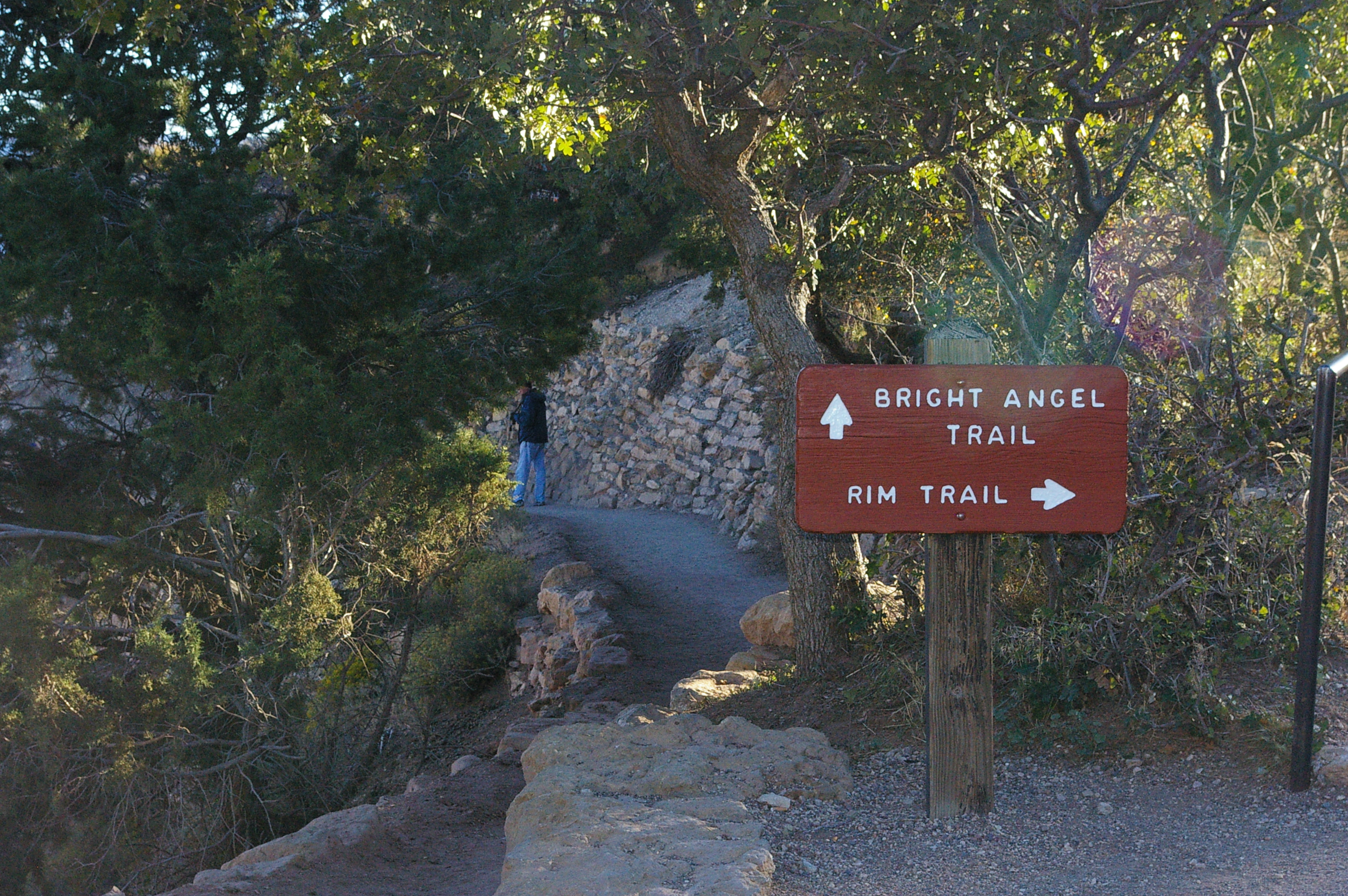
Bright Angel Trail head on the south rim.

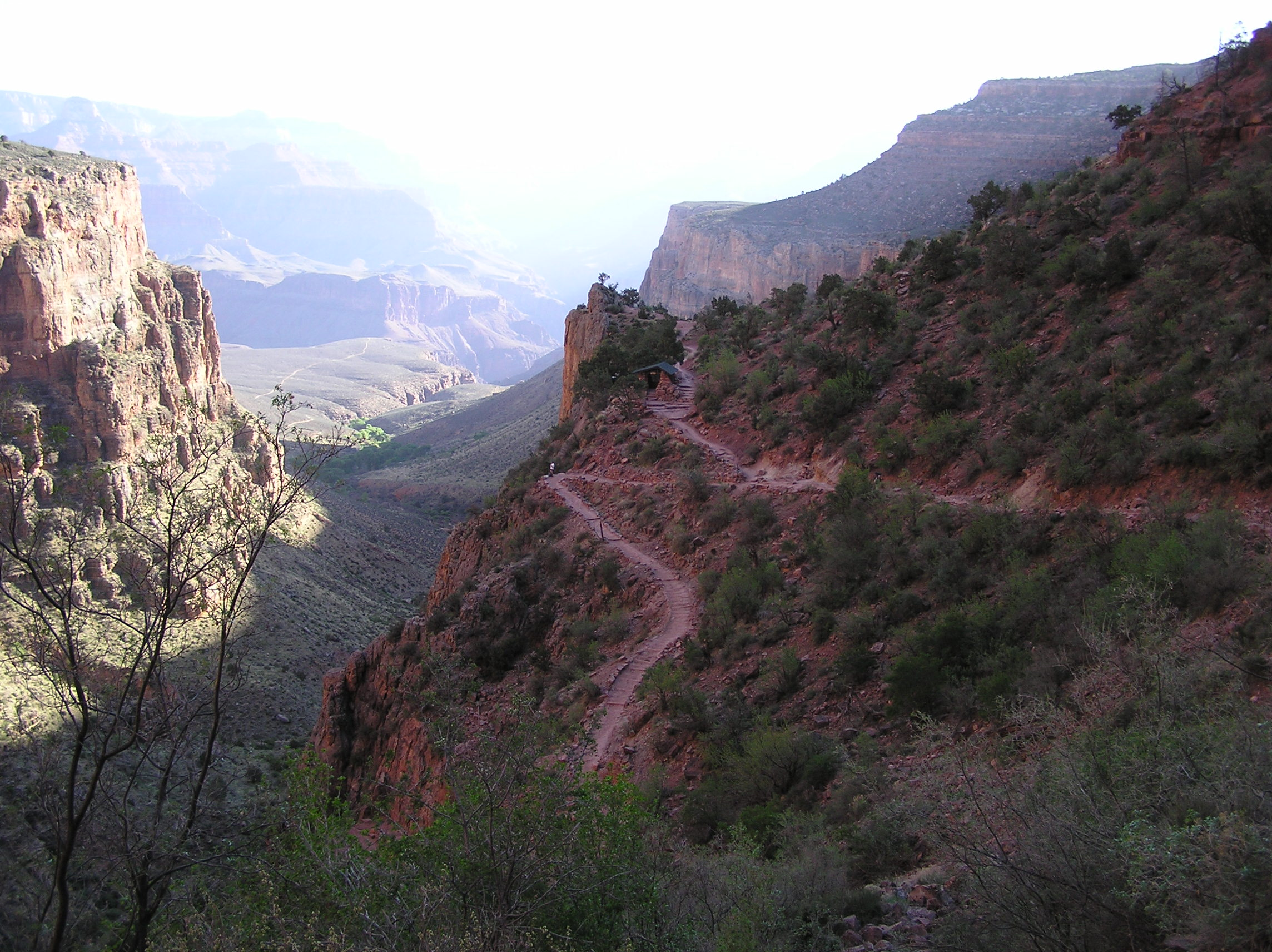
Havasupai Gardens (bright green riparian patch in the middle-far distance) and Three Mile Resthouse (right foreground) along Bright Angel Trail

The trail originates at Grand Canyon Village on the south rim of the Grand Canyon, descending 4380 feet to the Colorado River. It has an average grade of 10% along its entire length, but over two thirds of the elevation change occurs within the first 4.9 mi (7.9 km) to Havasupai Gardens. The trail ends at the Colorado River, where the River Trail continues another 1.9 mi (3.1 km) to the Bright Angel Campground and Phantom Ranch. These two trails combined are the most common method used to access Phantom Ranch by hikers and mules.

Two trails cross or join the Bright Angel Trail, the first being an intersection with the Tonto Trail at Havasupai Gardens, leading toward the Monument Use Area to the west, and to the South Kaibab Trail 4.7 miles (7.6 km) to the east. The second is the River Trail, which officially begins when the Bright Angel Trail reaches the Colorado River at the River Resthouse (although some consider that the Bright Angel Trail officially ends after crossing the Colorado River at the Silver Bridge).

Mileages and features along Bright Angel Trail
Distance (mi)	Elv (ft)	Location	Trail Junction
0	6860	Trailhead, South Rim	Rim Trail
1.6	5729	Mile-and-a-half Resthouse	
3.1	4748	Three Mile Resthouse	
4.9	3800	Havasupai Gardens	Tonto Trail; Plateau Point Trail
8.0	2480	River Resthouse, Colorado River	River Trail
9.5	2480	Bright Angel Campground (via the River Trail)	
9.9	2546	Phantom Ranch	

=== Condition ===
Grand Canyon National Park categorizes the Bright Angel Trail as a corridor trail. With this designation it receives regular maintenance and patrols by park rangers.

=== Water availability ===
Water is available from the trans-canyon pipeline at the Mile-and-a-half Resthouse, the Three Mile Resthouse, and Havasupai Gardens. During cooler months (usually October–April) the two higher elevation resthouses are shut off from the water supply to prevent the pipeline from freezing.

Below Havasupai Gardens, both Garden Creek and Pipe Creek flow year-round (perennial). Water is also available at the River Resthouse from the Colorado River. All water from natural sources must be filtered, treated, or boiled prior to consuming.

=== Camping ===
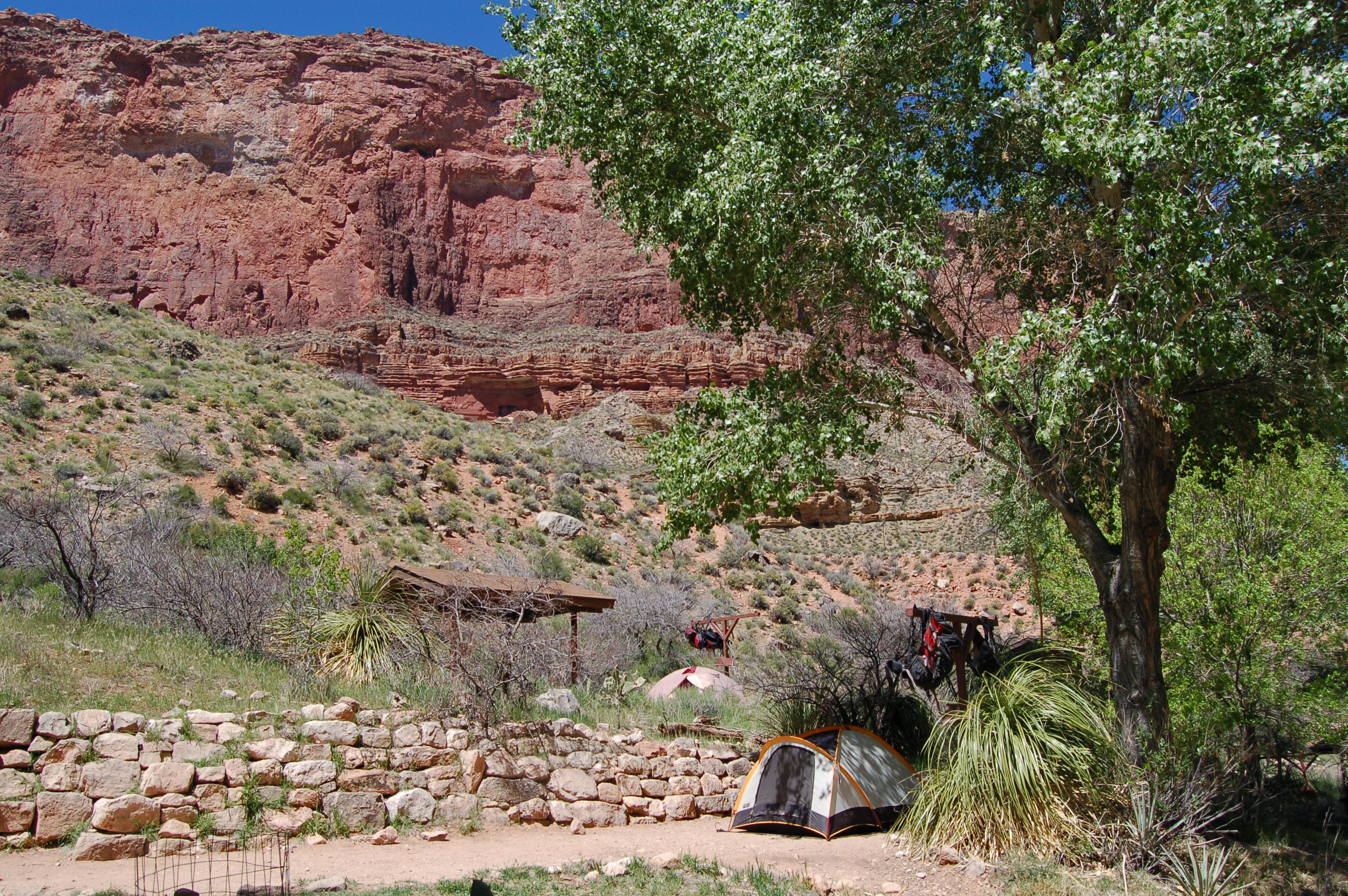
Havasupai Gardens Campground

Hikers can camp at Havasupai Gardens Campground or at the Bright Angel Campground. At either site, they can stay overnight with a permit issued by the Grand Canyon National Park Backcountry Information Center. Overnight use of the campgrounds is regulated by the National Park Service, and they call for a maximum number of groups (7 to 11 people) and parties (1 to 6 people), as well as a maximum total number of persons.

Use permits are available on a first-come, first-served basis from the park's Backcountry Information Center. Requests are taken beginning on the 1st day of the month, up to four months before the requested first night of camping.

=== Hazards ===
Hazards that hikers can encounter along the Bright Angel Trail include dehydration, hyperhydration, sudden rainstorms, flash flooding, loose footing, bootpacked ice, rockfall, encounters with wildlife, and extreme heat. At the Colorado River, additional hazards include hypothermia (due to the river's consistently cold temperatures), trauma (due to collisions with boulders in rapids), and drowning. Also, the trail is used by the mules transporting people and gear to and from the bottom of the canyon. Although these mules are trained, the Bright Angel trail is narrow in some places, and hikers should allow pack mules the right of way. The trail also has many switchbacks, and a bad fall can result in serious injuries.

== History ==
=== Havasupai ===
The upper part of the trail was originally built by the Havasupai people for access to the perennial water source of present-day Garden Creek. The Havasupai settled seasonally in this area, previously known as Indian Garden (or Indian Gardens). In 1903, President Theodore Roosevelt ordered them to leave the area, to make way for a park. However, it was not until 1928 that the last Havasupai left, forced out by the National Park Service.

In November 2022 the U.S. Board on Geographic Names approved a name change to Havasupai Gardens requested by the National Park Service on behalf of the Havasupai tribe, who regarded the old name as offensive and a painful reminder of past injustices. A public ceremony for the name change took place on May 5, 2023 on the South Rim of the Grand Canyon, with members of the Havasupai Tribe and Grand Canyon National Park leaders.

=== Ralph Cameron ===
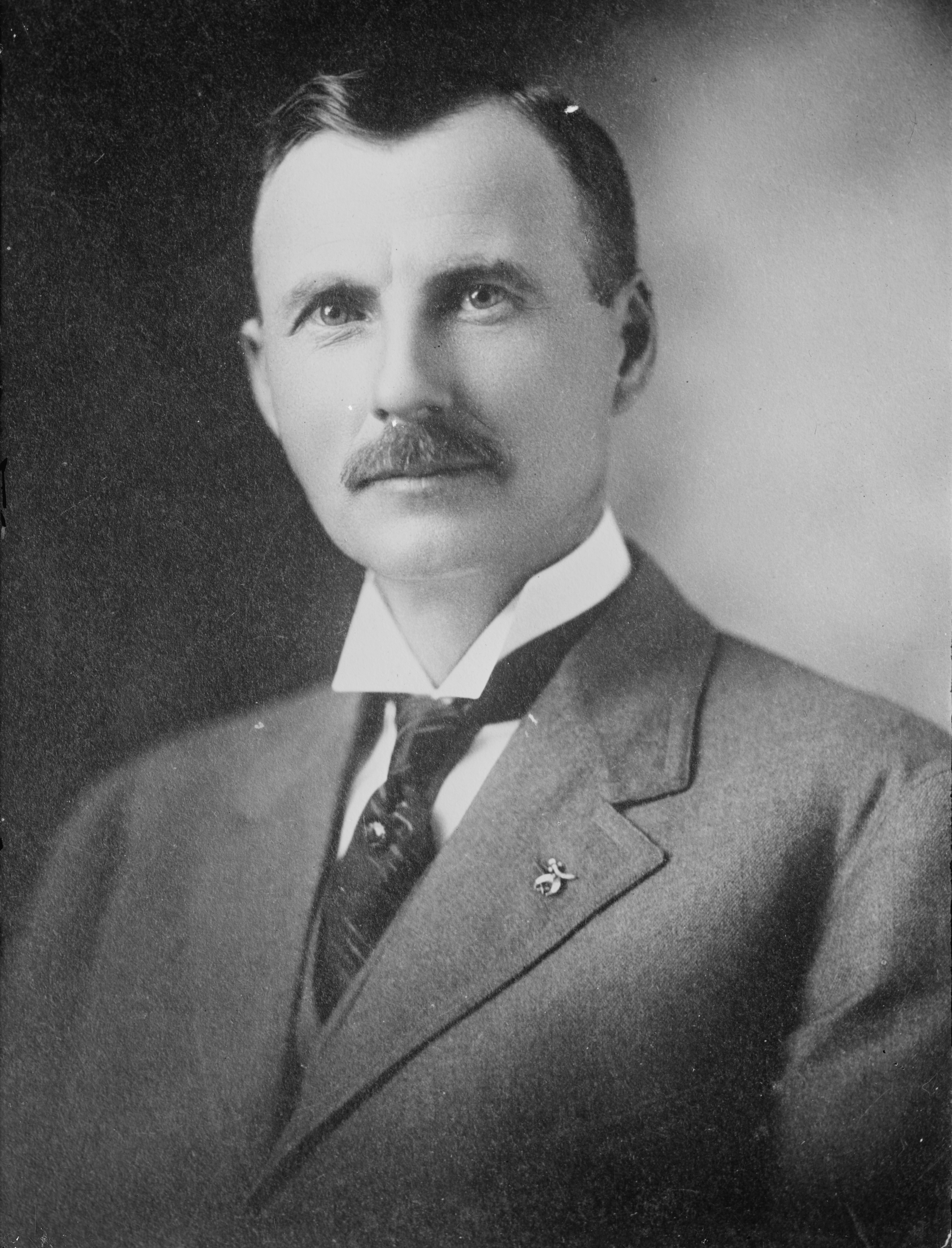
Ralph Cameron

Ralph H. Cameron, who would later become a United States senator (R-AZ 1921–27), settled on the canyon rim in 1890 and began improving the old Havasupai trail. It was at this time that the trail was extended all the way to the Colorado River. Once official control of the trail fell to Cameron, he named it the Bright Angel Trail, commonly referred to in its early years as Cameron's Trail, and began charging a $1 toll to access it, plus additional fees for drinking water and the use of outhouses at Havasupai Gardens.

=== Kolb brothers ===
Ellsworth Kolb arrived at the Grand Canyon to work at the Bright Angel Hotel in 1901. He was employed as a bellboy. The next year, Ellsworth invited his brother Emery to come to the canyon as the possibility of mine work opened up. However, John Hance's asbestos mine closed before he arrived, leaving Emery unemployed.

Shortly after this, Emery discovered a photography business for sale in Williams, Arizona. He purchased the business for US$425 (equivalent to about $15,800 in 2025) and moved the operation back to the Grand Canyon. He and Ellsworth began taking photographs of visitors who took the mule rides down Cameron's trail, charging a fee for the pictures. The Cameron family leased a small piece of land nearby to Emery, where the two brothers set up a photography studio in a tent to develop and sell their photos.

The business was profitable and after a few years the Kolb brothers built their permanent studio building on the rim of the canyon. Rock was blasted away to provide the foundation for the building, which is perched slightly below rim level.

Ellsworth left the venture in 1924, but Emery continued operating the studio until his death in 1976. The present-day Kolb Studio is operated by the Grand Canyon Association as a gift shop, art studio, and history center.

=== Competition with Cameron ===
To compete with Cameron, the Atchison, Topeka and Santa Fe Railway improved an existing horsethief trail in Hermit Canyon (the Hermit Trail) in 1911. In 1924, the newly created National Park Service began construction of the South Kaibab Trail near Yaki Point as an additional bypass for Cameron's tolls.

=== National Park Service Control ===
After a long series of legal battles, the trail was turned over to the National Park Service in 1928.

== See also ==
- List of trails in Grand Canyon National Park
