= Black Suspension Bridge =

Pedestrian bridge over the Colorado River in the Grand Canyon

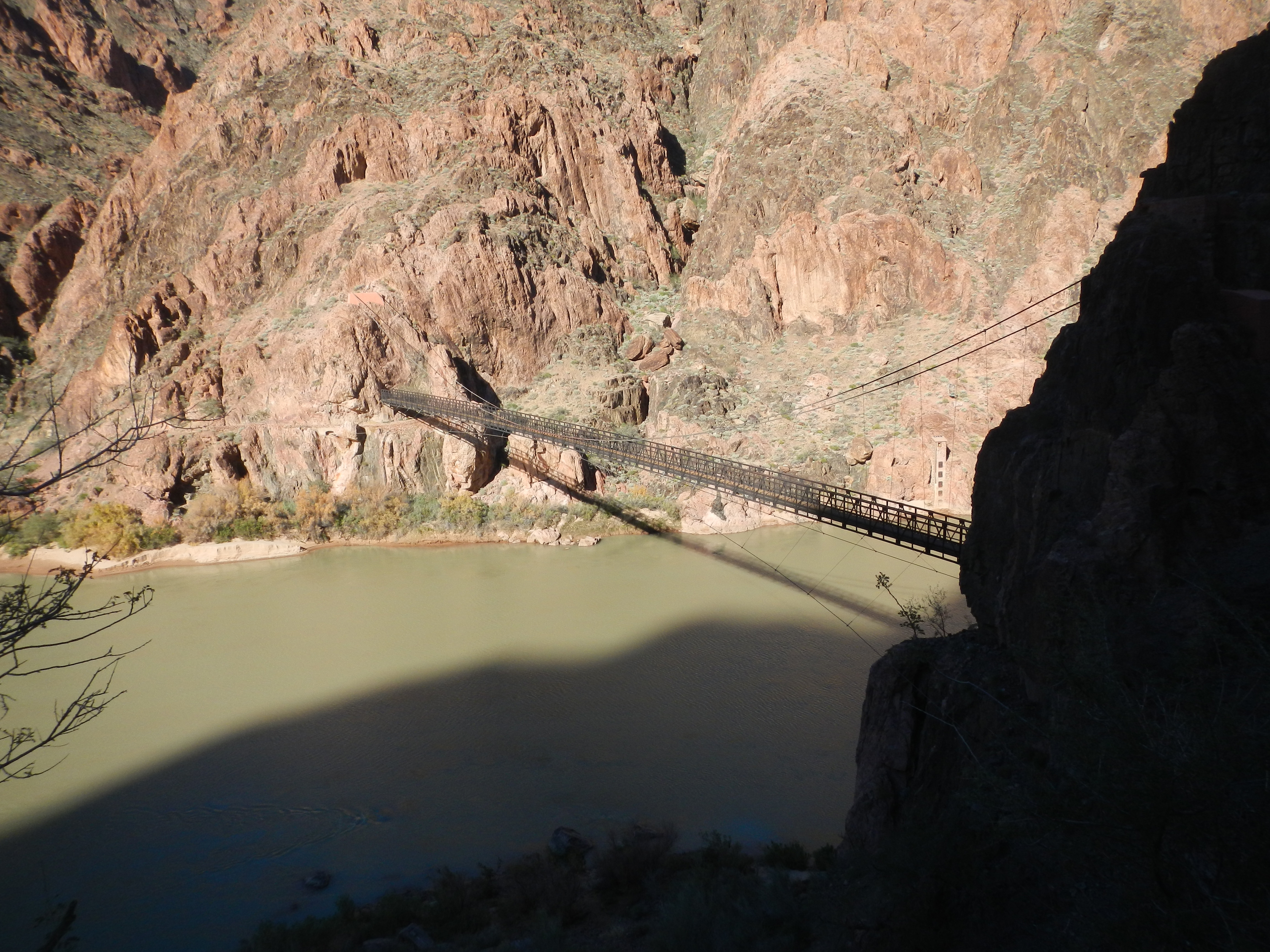
- Black Suspension Bridge from the South Kaibab Trail
- Coordinates: 36.1009°N 112.0892°W
- Carries: Pedestrians, pack animals
- Crosses: Colorado River
- Locale: Grand Canyon National Park, Arizona, United States
- Owner: National Park Service

Characteristics
- Design: Suspension bridge
- Width: 5 feet (1.5 m)
- Longest span: 440 feet (130 m)

History
- Designer: Ward P. Webber

Location
- Interactive map of Black Suspension Bridge

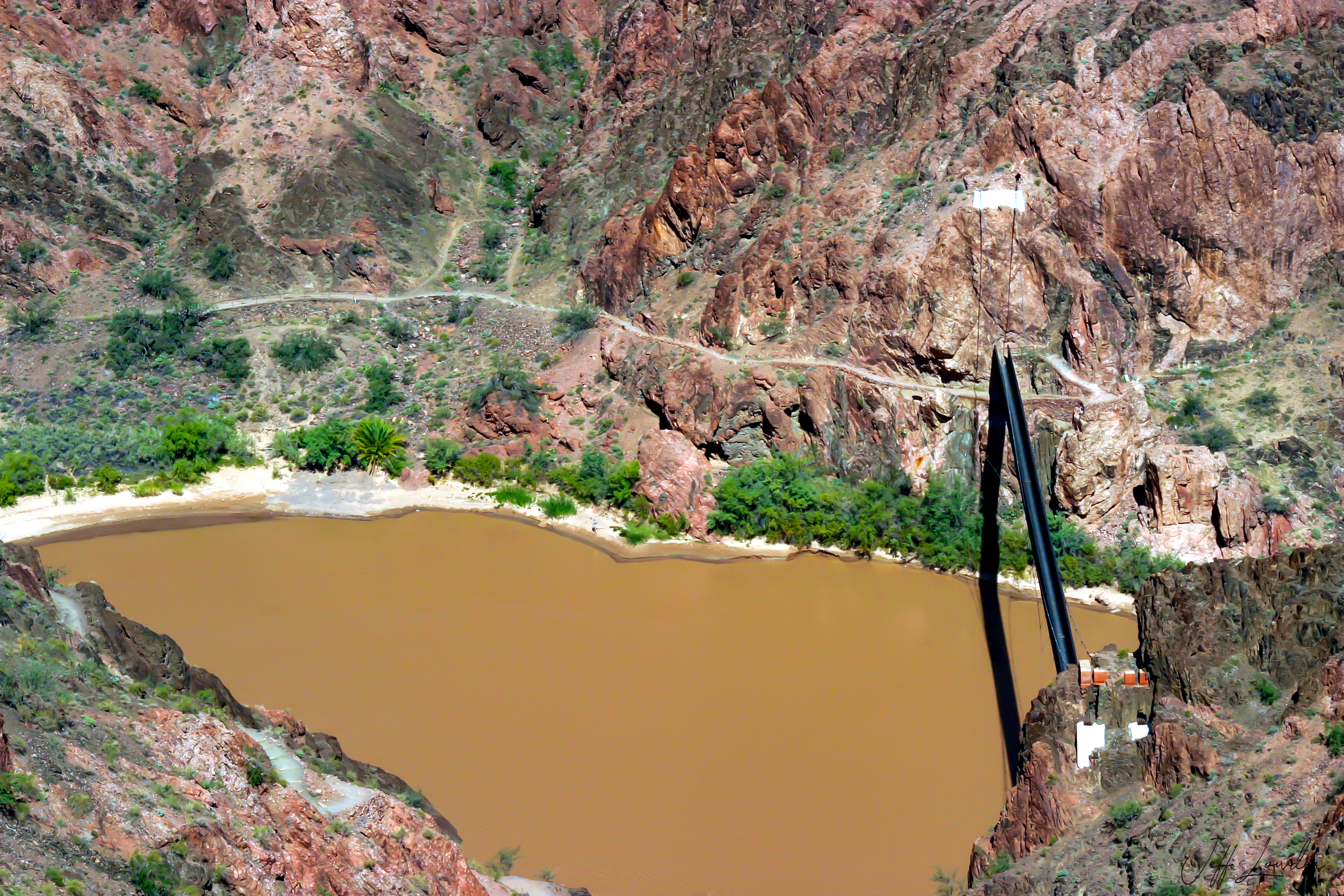
The black suspension bridge casts a shadow over the muddy Colorado River below at mid-day.

The Black Suspension Bridge (also known as the Kaibab Trail Suspension Bridge) spans the Colorado River in the inner canyon of Grand Canyon National Park. The span length is 440 feet (130 m). The bridge is part of the South Kaibab Trail and is the river crossing used by mules going to Phantom Ranch. The Black Bridge and Silver Bridge, located about 700 metres (2,300 ft) downstream, are the only spans in hundreds of river miles.

== History ==
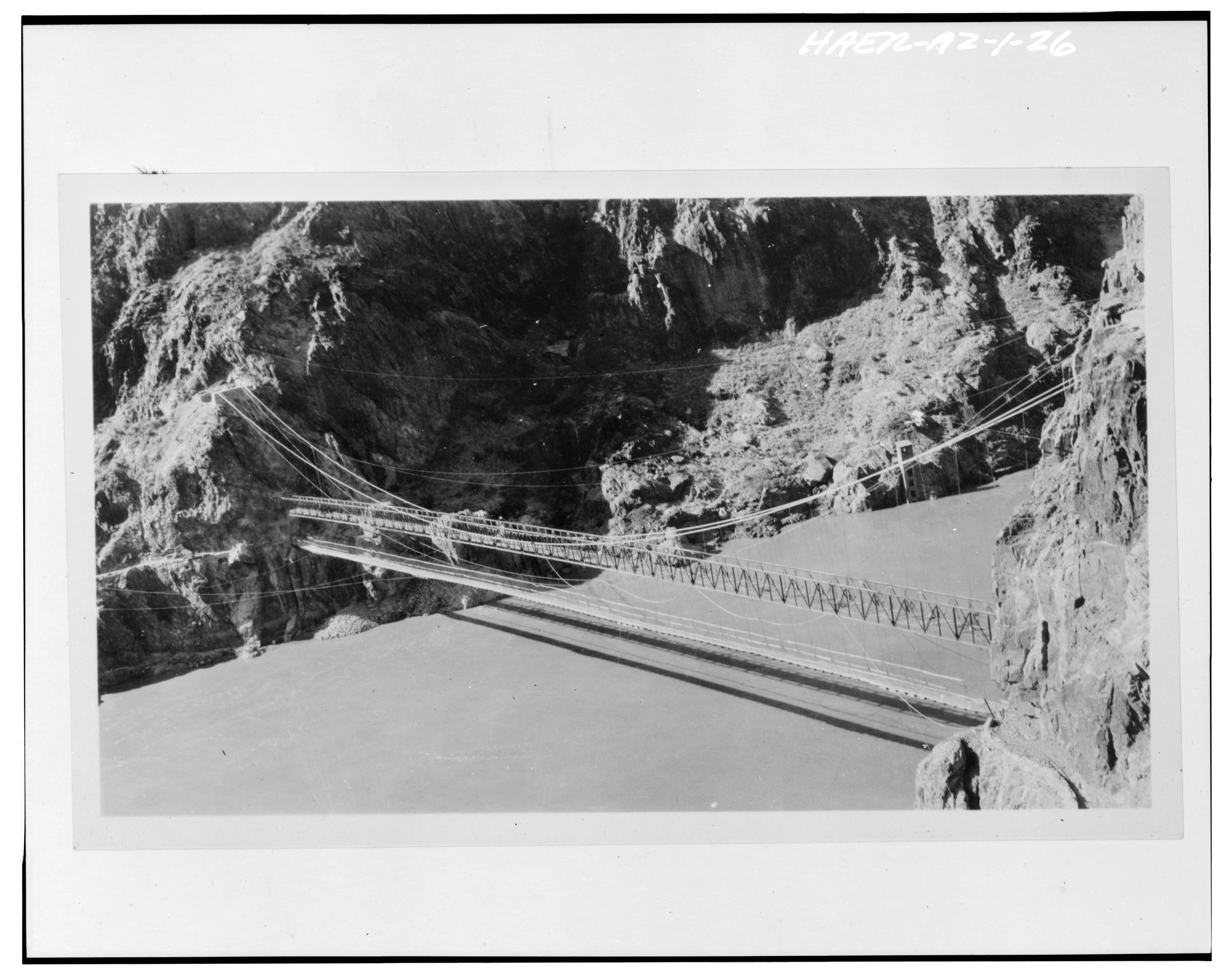
A picture of the Black Bridge as it neared completion in 1928, with the 1920 bridge directly beneath it before it was demolished.

Before 1907, the only way to cross the river was by boat, a dangerous method which cost many lives. Then, outdoorsman David Rust built a privately operated cableway. The cableway was a 6 by 10 feet (2 by 3 m) steel cage large enough for one mule or several people that would carry passengers across the river, but the passage was considered precarious. Theodore Roosevelt used the cableway in 1913. The second crossing was a suspension bridge that lacked stiffness. It was built in 1920 and proved to be too flexible to safely carry pedestrians across the river as the number of visitors to the park was increasing.

Black Bridge was designed by Ward Webber and constructed by John Lawrence. The Black Bridge was built in 1928. It would remain the only crossing of the river for hundreds of river miles until the Silver Bridge was built just downstream within the park during the 1960s. As motorized vehicles could not access the construction site, humans and mules transported the 122 tons in materials down the 9 miles (14 km) of trail. Walking single file, 42 Havasupai tribesmen carried the one-ton, 550-foot (170 m) suspension cables.

== Recognition ==
The bridge was documented by the Historic American Engineering Record in 1984. On February 23, 2019, the bridge was recognized as a National Historic Civil Engineering Landmark by the American Society of Civil Engineers, saying, "The Kaibab Trail Suspension Bridge is a prime example of engineering innovation. Engineering this bridge at the base of one of the world’s greatest wonders—the Grand Canyon—illustrates the resourcefulness and innovative spirit of the civil engineers responsible for this project." As of 2019, the bridge has remained unchanged since it was constructed 91 years ago.

== See also ==
- List of bridges documented by the Historic American Engineering Record in Arizona
