= Itak, Arizona =

- Populated place
- Location within the state of Arizona Itak (the United States)
- Coordinates: 31°41′41″N 112°00′25″W
- Country: United States
- State: Arizona
- County: Pima
- Elevation: 2,300 ft (700 m)
- Time zone: UTC-7 (Mountain (MST))
  - Summer (DST): UTC-7 (MST)
- Area code: 520
- GNIS feature ID: 24471

Itak is a populated place situated in Pima County, Arizona, United States. Itak means "point of mountain" in the O'odham language. European settlers had referred to this place as Rocky Point at least through the early part of the twentieth century. On September 8, 1939, the Office of Indian Affairs (now Bureau of Indian Affairs) petitioned the USGS to officially recognize the name of the location as Itak, as that was the name preferred by the local residents, and was more historical. On April 10, 1941, the Board on Geographic Names rendered its decision, officially naming the place Itak. It has an estimated elevation of 2,297 feet (700 m) above sea level. (Note: The detail information regarding the BGN decision may be found on the decision card link on the GNIS footnote.)
