= Indian Hot Springs, Arizona =

Populated place in Graham County, Arizona

- Populated place
- Location within the state of Arizona Indian Hot Springs (the United States)
- Coordinates: 32°59′54″N 109°54′02″W
- Country: United States
- State: Arizona
- County: Graham
- Elevation: 2,792 ft (851 m)
- Time zone: UTC-7 (Mountain (MST))
  - Summer (DST): UTC-7 (MST)
- Area code: 928
- FIPS code: 35115
- GNIS feature ID: 6214

Indian Hot Springs, also known as Holladay Hot Springs, is a populated place situated in Graham County, Arizona, United States.

== Geothermal springs ==
The hot springs located at Indian Hot Springs emerge from the ground at a temperature of 118 °F / 48 °C.

== See also ==
- Indian Hot Springs
