= Indian Gardens, Arizona =

Populated place in Coconino County, Arizona

- Populated place
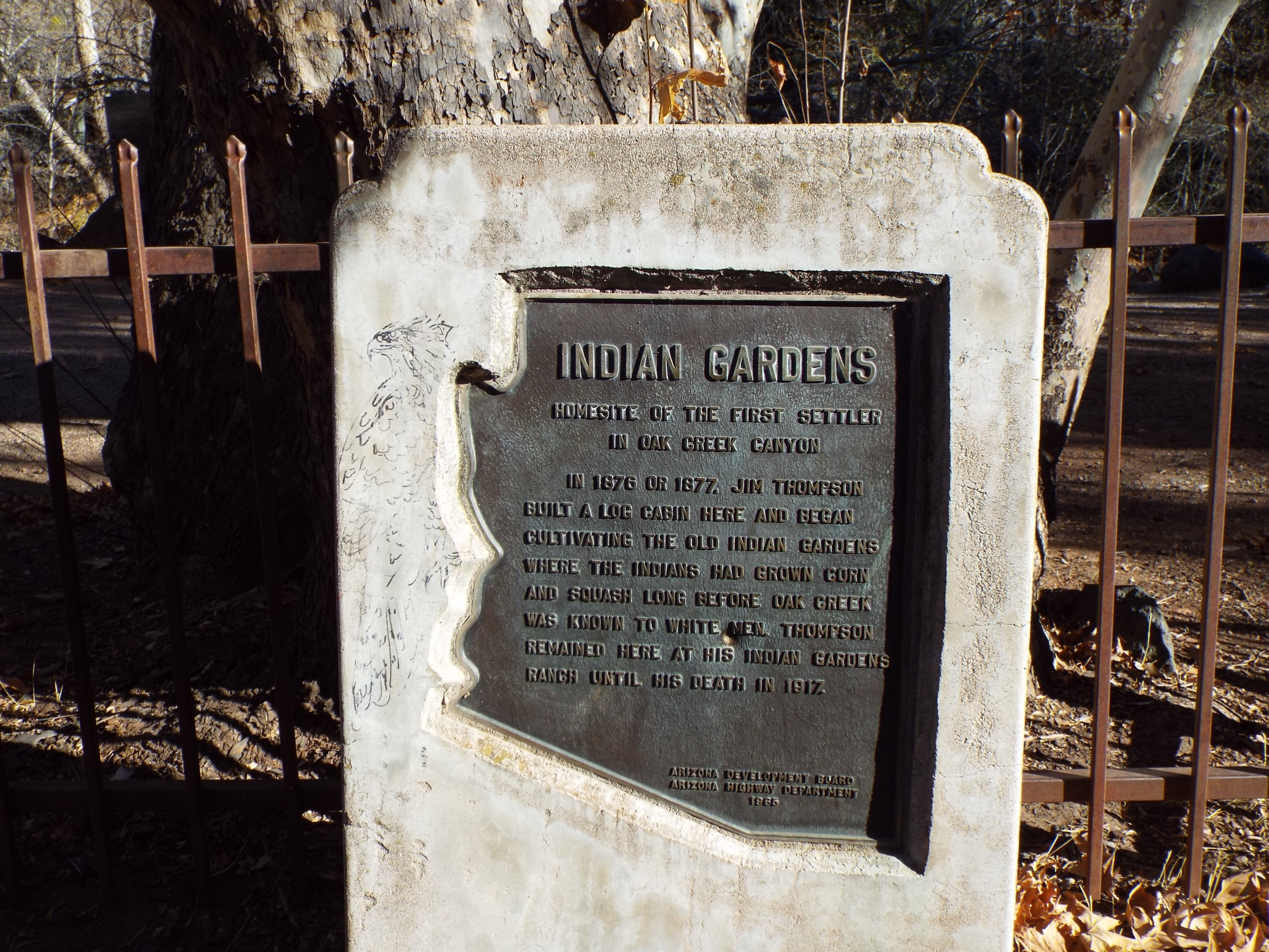
- Indian Gardens marker

- Location within the state of Arizona Indian Gardens (the United States)
- Coordinates: 34°54′50″N 111°43′38″W
- Country: United States
- State: Arizona
- County: Coconino
- Elevation: 4,603 ft (1,403 m)
- Time zone: UTC-7 (Mountain (MST))
  - Summer (DST): UTC-7 (MST)
- Area code: 928
- FIPS code: 04-35100
- GNIS feature ID: 30342

Indian Gardens is a populated place situated on the east side of Oak Creek Canyon, in Coconino County, Arizona, United States, north of Sedona. It has an estimated elevation of 4,603 feet (1,403 m) above sea level.

== History ==
The first white settler in the Sedona area, John James Thompson, settled at Indian Gardens in 1876. Thompson called the place Indian Gardens because natives grew corn and squash on the site.

Located on State Route 89A, Indian Gardens Cafe and Market, established in 1940, is the oldest continually operated general store in the Sedona area.

In 1965, residents living along the east side of Oak Creek started the Indian Gardens Improvement Association to deal with local issues, most specifically the rebuilding of a washed-out bridge which cut off access to property owners.
