= North Kaibab Trail =

Grand Canyon hiking trail

Coordinates: 36.21706°N 112.05591°W

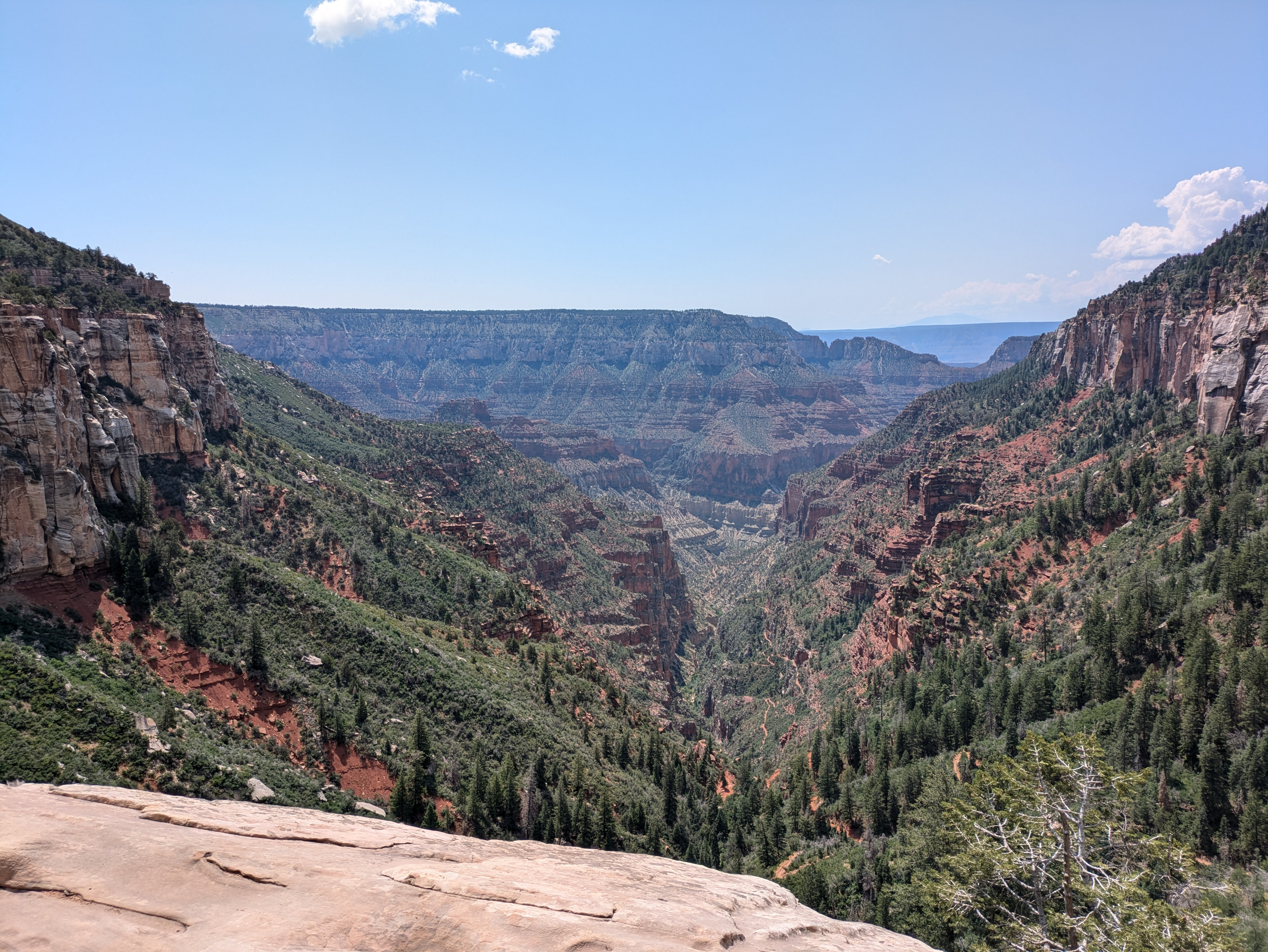
- Looking down on the trail after descending a short distance from the North Rim
- Length: 14 mi (23 km)
- Location: Grand Canyon National Park, Arizona, United States
- Trailheads: Phantom Ranch; Grand Canyon (North Rim)
- Use: Hiking; Stock (mule use)
- Elevation change: 5,660 ft (1,730 m)
- Highest point: North Rim, 8,060 ft (2,460 m)
- Lowest point: Colorado River, 2,400 ft (730 m)
- Difficulty: Strenuous
- Season: Spring through Fall
- Sights: Grand Canyon; Colorado River
- Hazards: Severe weather overexertion dehydration flash floods

The North Kaibab Trail is a hiking trail in the North Rim side of the Grand Canyon, in Grand Canyon National Park, located in the U.S. state of Arizona.

== Access ==
Access to this part of the park by car is seasonal, open from mid-May to mid-October or depending on snow cover from the previous winter.

It is possible to reach the North Kaibab Trailhead by crossing the canyon on foot from the South Rim or by snowshoe or cross-country ski beginning at Jacob Lake, Arizona.

== Description ==
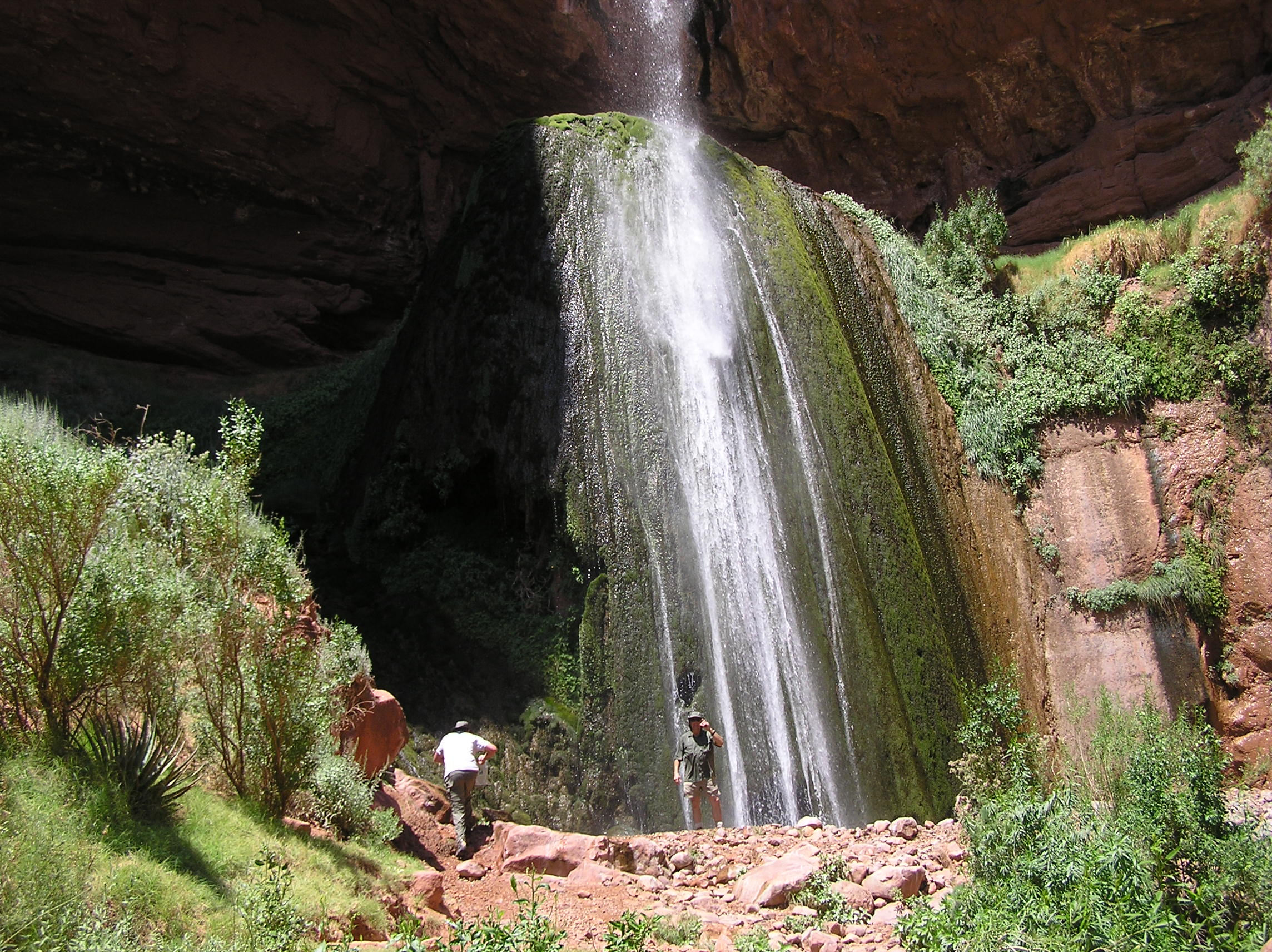
Ribbon Falls on the North Kaibab Trail

Mileages and features along North Kaibab Trail
Distance (mi)	Elv (ft)	Location	Trail Junction	Toilet	Water
0	8241	Trailhead, North Rim	Uncle Jim Trail; Ken Patrick Trail	Portable	Seasonal, Treated
1.7	6800	Supai Tunnel		Composting	Seasonal, Treated
5	5220	Roaring Springs		Composting	Seasonal, Treated
6.9	4080	Cottonwood Campground		Composting	Seasonal, Treated
8.5	3720	Ribbon Falls			
13.1		Trail Junction	Clear Creek Trail		
13.6	2545	Phantom Ranch		Septic	Treated
13.8	2480	Bright Angel Campground	Utah Flats Route	Septic	Treated
14	2460	Trail Junction	River Trail; South Kaibab Trail	Septic	Treated

The North Kaibab Trail begins at the head of Roaring Springs canyon and ends at the Colorado River.

The trailhead is at a parking area on Arizona State Route 67, about 1-mile (1.6 km) north of the North Rim's Grand Canyon Lodge. The Ken Patrick Trail and Uncle Jim Trail are also accessible from this parking area.

The trail is 14 miles (23 km) long, with camping available by permit at Cottonwood Camp at 7 miles (11 km) and Bright Angel Camp at 14 miles (23 km). Treated water is available seasonally at the Supai Tunnel, Roaring Springs, the Caretaker's Dwelling, and Cottonwood Campground; and year-round at Bright Angel Campground and Phantom Ranch. Features along the trail include Roaring Springs, Ribbon Falls (140 ft), The Box (a slot canyon), and Phantom Ranch.

=== Part of Arizona Trail ===
The North Kaibab Trail is also part of the Arizona Trail system, crossing the state of Arizona from Mexico to Utah. The trail is joined by South Kaibab Trail which is located to the south of the trail.

=== Condition ===
Grand Canyon National Park categorizes the North Kaibab Trail as a corridor trail. With this designation it receives regular maintenance and patrols by park rangers.

=== Camping ===
Hikers may only camp at the Bright Angel or Cottonwood Campgrounds, where they can stay overnight with a permit issued by the Grand Canyon National Park Backcountry Information Center. Use of the campground overnight is regulated by the National Park Service, and they call for a maximum number of groups (7 to 11 people) and parties (1 to 6 people), as well as a maximum total number of persons.

Overnight camping areas near River Trail
Area	Name	Type	Group(s)		Parties	Max people
CCG	Cottonwood	Campground (summer); Campground (winter)	1; 1	and or	6; 1	40; 8
CBG	Bright Angel	Campground	2	and	31	90

Use permits are available on a first-come, first-served basis from the park's Backcountry Information Center. Requests are taken beginning on the first day of the month, up to four months before the requested first night of camping.

=== Hazards ===
Hazards hikers can encounter along the North Kaibab Trail include dehydration, sudden rainstorms, flash flooding, loose footing, rockfall, encounters with wildlife, and extreme heat. At the Colorado River, additional hazards include hypothermia (due to the river's consistently cold temperatures), trauma (due to collisions with boulders in rapids), and drowning.

== See also ==
- List of trails in Grand Canyon National Park
