= Ochoa Point =

Landform in the Grand Canyon, Arizona

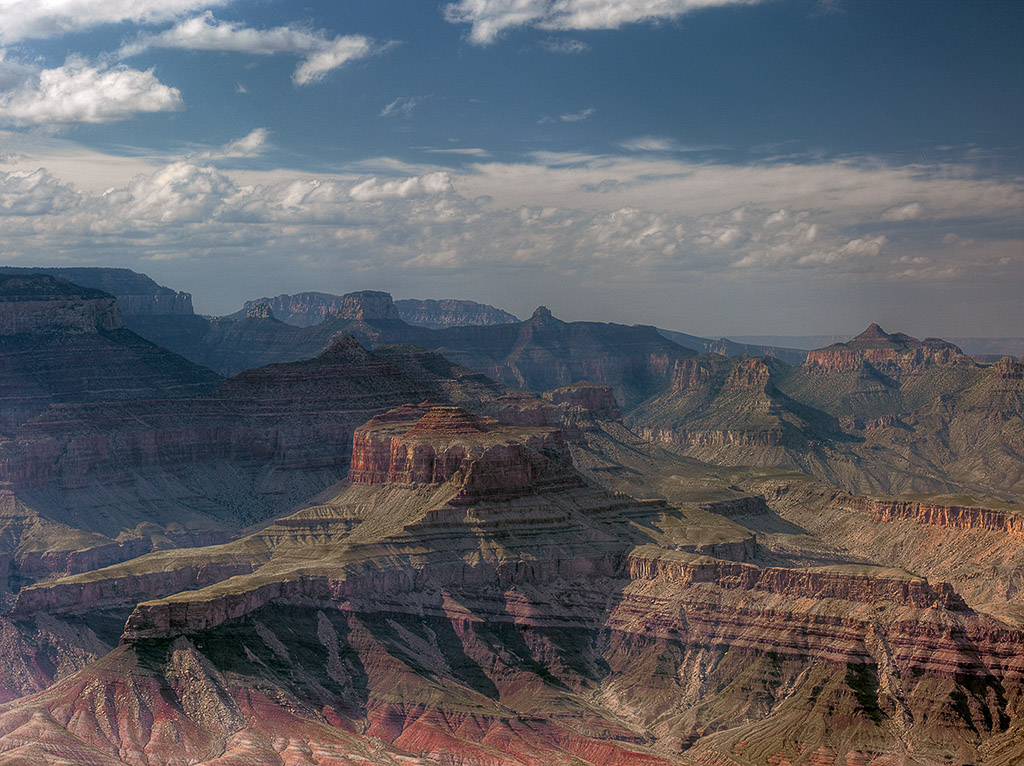

Highest point
- Elevation: 4,761 ft (1,451 m)
- Prominence: 141 ft (43 m)
- Parent peak: Apollo Temple
- Isolation: 1.03 mi (1.66 km)
- Coordinates: 36.1038745°N 111.8621045°W

Geography
- Location within Arizona Location within the United States
- Location: Grand Canyon National Park; Coconino County, Arizona, US
- Parent range: Kaibab Plateau (Walhalla Plateau); Colorado Plateau
- Topo map: USGS Desert View

Geology
- Rock age: Cambrian down to Mesoproterozoic
- Mountain type(s): sedimentary rock: shale, sandstone, siltstone, mudstone, volcanic rock: basalt, sandstone, mudstone, dolomite
- Rock type(s): Bright Angel Shale-(prominence-(slope-debris)); Tapeats Sandstone, Grand Canyon Supergroup-members, Nankoweap Formation; Unkar Group-members-(5); 5_Cardenas Basalt, 4_Dox Formation

Ochoa Point is a 4,761-foot-elevation cliff-summit located in the eastern Grand Canyon, in Coconino County of northern Arizona, US. The landform is on a southeast ridgeline from Apollo Temple, with the Ochoa Point prominence on its southeast terminus. Ochoa Point is 1.0 mi from Apollo Temple, 1.5 mi northwest from the southeast-flowing Colorado River, and 3.5 miles due-west from the south terminus of the East Rim, Grand Canyon (Palisades of the Desert).

Ochoa Point’s southwest cliff-flank, and Apollo Temple’s southwest arm (southeast flank), contain the dp-black Basalt Cliffs (composed of Cardenas Basalt); the Cardenas Basalt lies upon brilliantly colored reddish Dox Formation low-angle, erosion-slopes (units 5 and 4) of five Unkar Group members. What makes Ochoa Point distinctive, the next rock unit above is the colorful, layered (banded), Nankoweap Formation. These rock layers all slope at approximately 15 degrees, and are topped by the short-cliff, horizontal Tapeats Sandstone (the Tonto Platform, and called the Great Unconformity).
