= Hakatai Shale =

Mesoproterozoic rock formation

- Stratigraphic range: Meso-Proterozoic, 1,200±50 Ma?
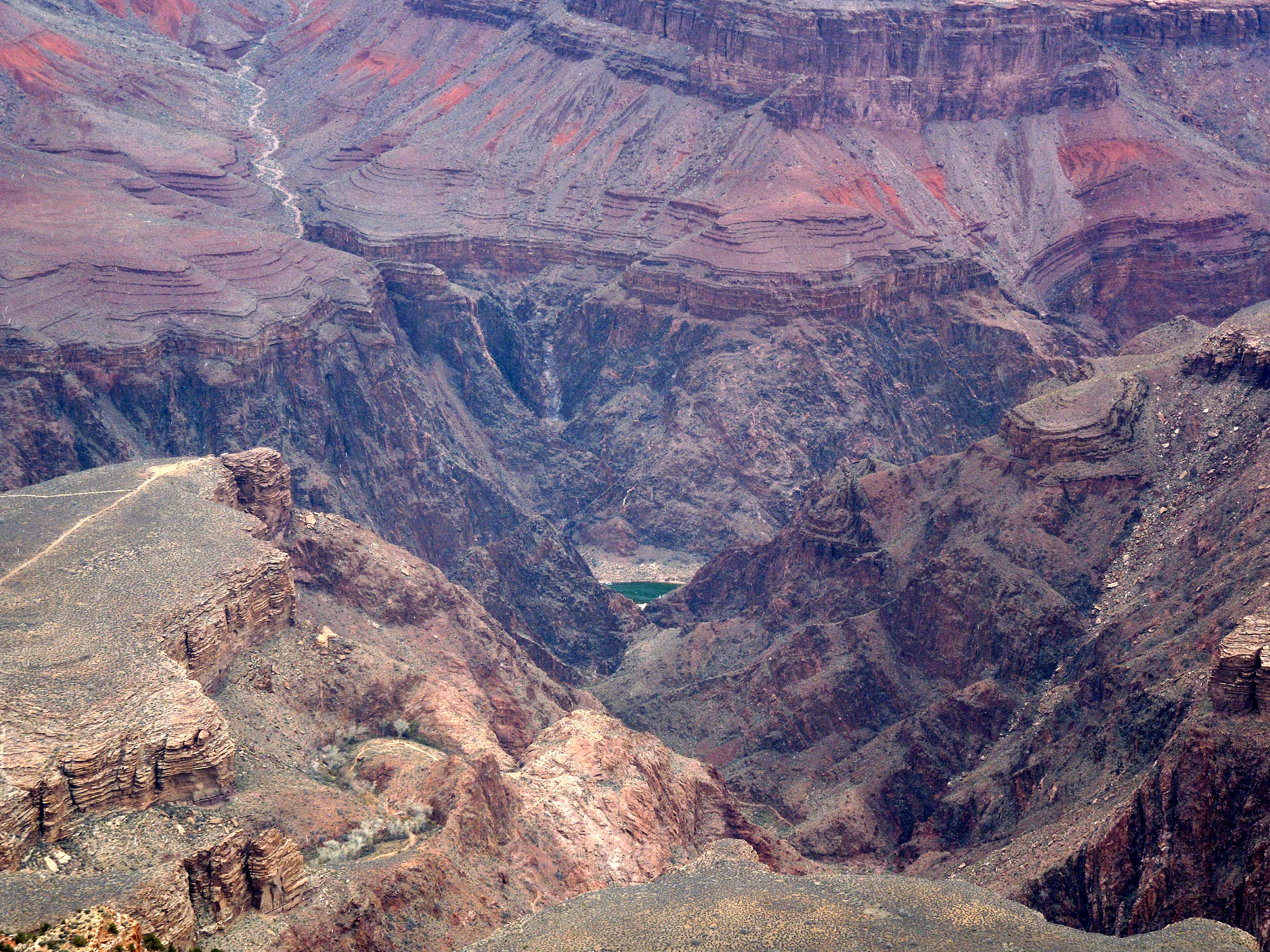
- Three approximate equal-thickness formations outcropping below Isis Temple-prominence at north perimeter, Granite Gorge (Unkar Group)–Shinumo Quartzite (vertical cliffs), upon basalt sills, upon orange-red Hakatai Shale, upon Bass Formation. Dk blackish canyons are the Granite Gorge Vishnu Basement Rocks.
- Type: Geological formation
- Unit of: Unkar Group
- Underlies: Shinumo Quartzite
- Overlies: Bass Formation
- Thickness: 300 m (980 ft) approximate maximum

Lithology
- Primary: shale
- Other: siltstone, sandy siltstone, and sandstone (subarkose, arkose and quartz arenite)

Location
- Region: Arizona, Grand Canyon; Isis Temple region, southwest Bright Angel Canyon, at north side, Granite Gorge, and along Colorado River, also, numerous side canyons to Granite Gorge / Colorado River
- Country: United States (Southwest United States)

Type section
- Named for: Hakatai Canyon
- Named by: Noble (1914)

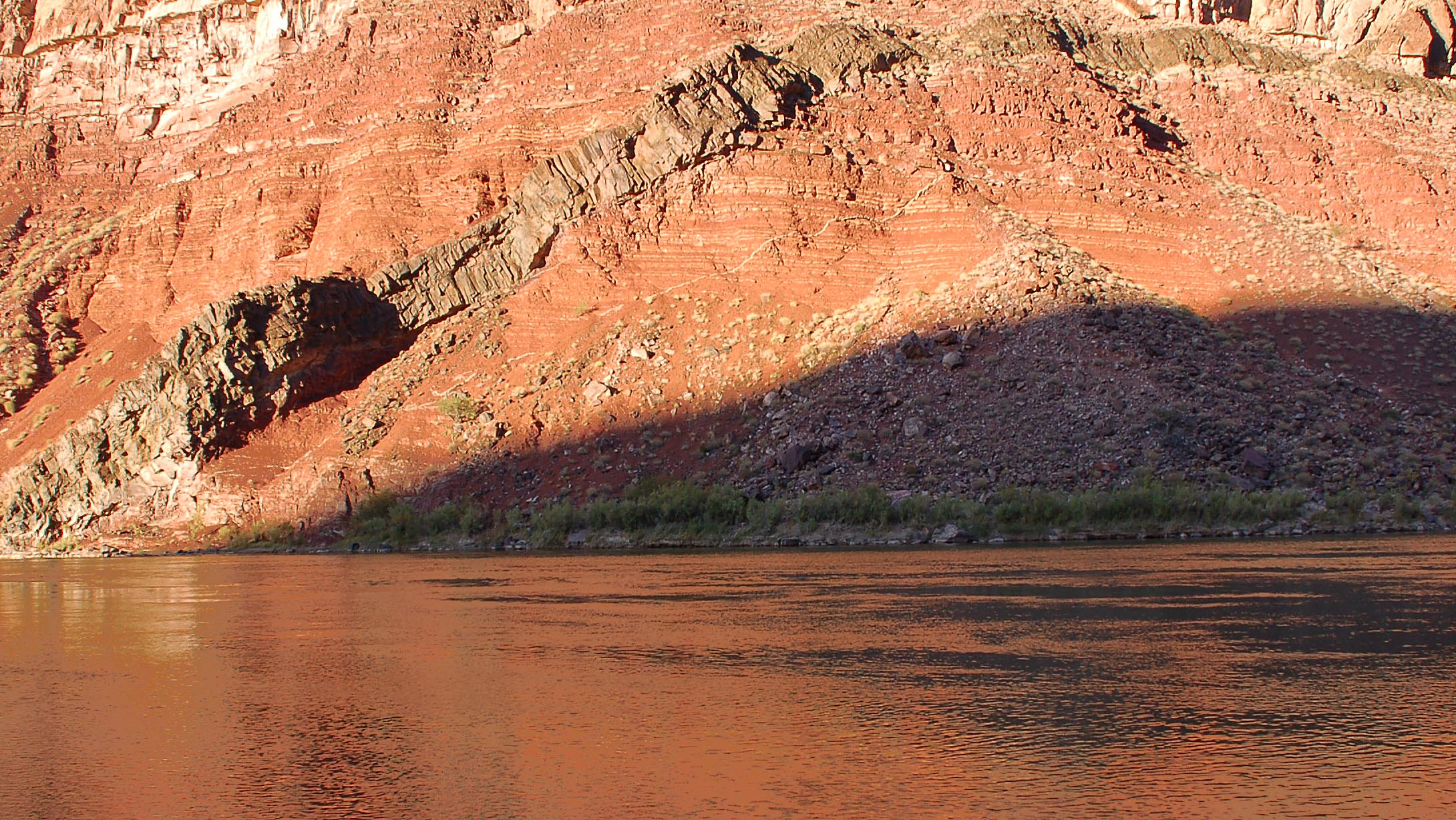
Basalt dike in orange-red Hakatai Shale along Colorado River at Hance Rapid, river mile 76.5, Grand Canyon.

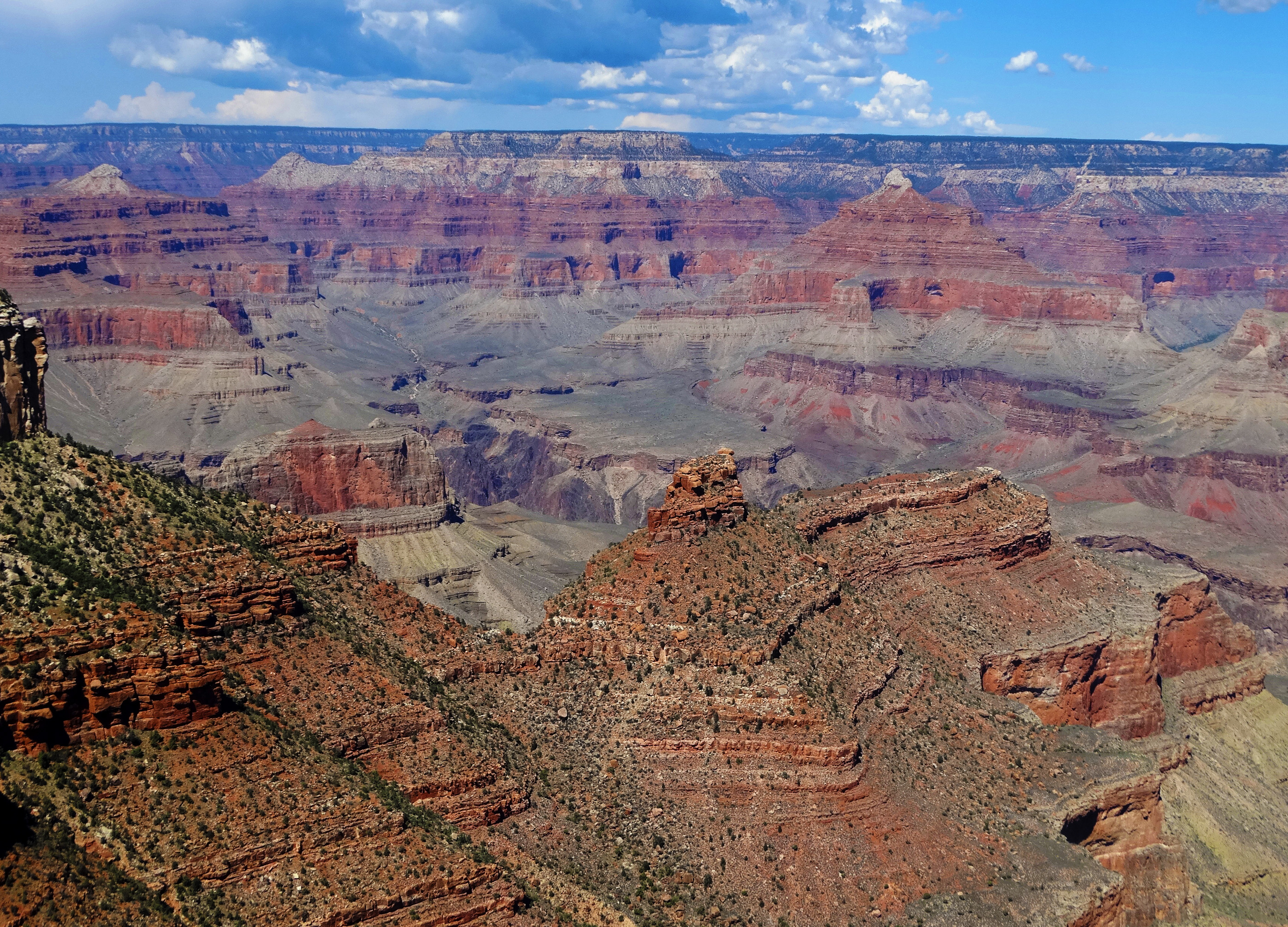
Many layers of rock. Tonto Group and Unkar units. Shows the Vishnu rocks; but also the orange Hakatai Shale, Shinumo Quartzite, some Bass Formation?, etc. The upper massive layers show the white cliffs of Coconino Sandstone over the Supai Group redbeds that sit upon the Redwall Limestone.

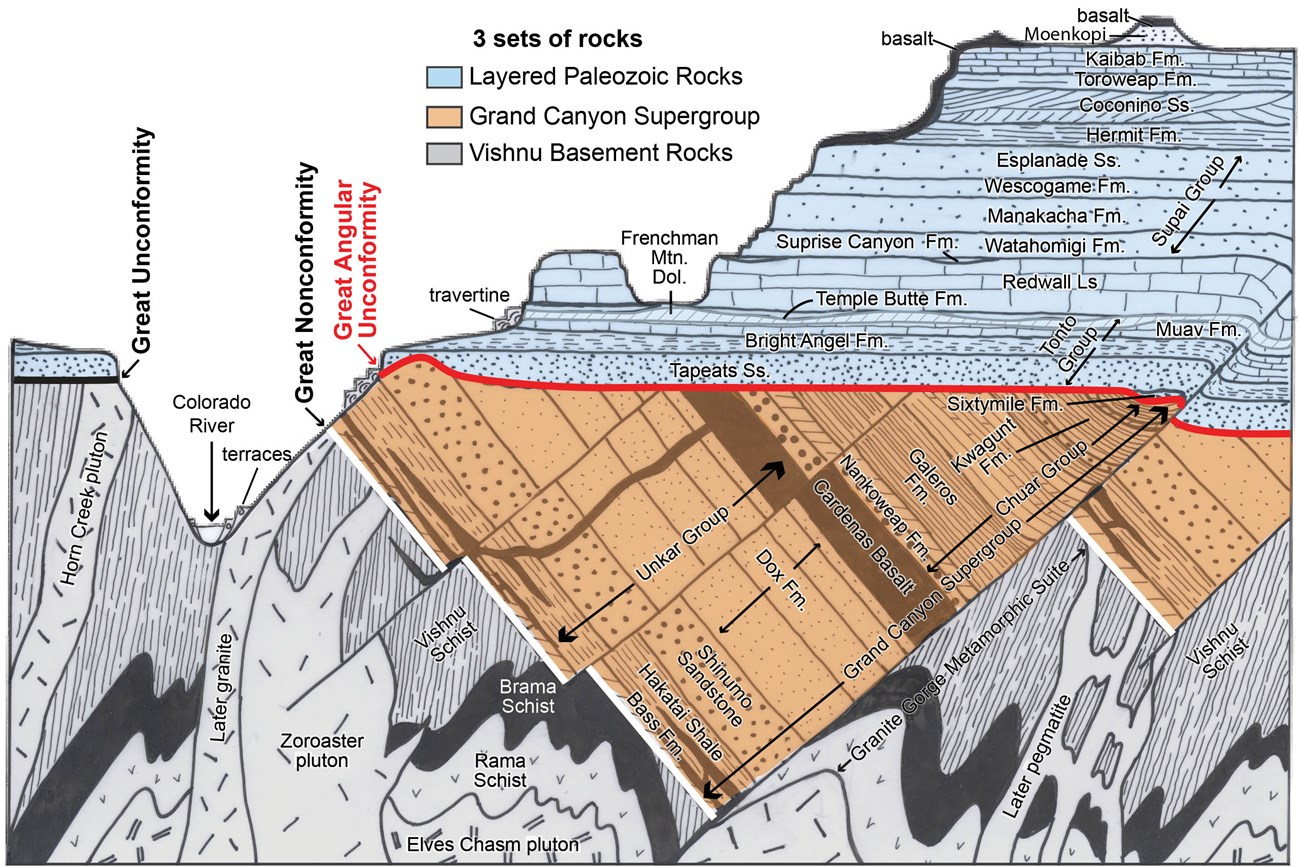
Geologic stratigraphic column of strata exposed in and near the Grand Canyon showing stratigraphic units and major unconformities.

The Hakatai Shale is a Mesoproterozoic rock formation with important exposures in the Grand Canyon, Coconino County, Arizona. It consists of colorful strata that exhibit colors varying from purple to red to brilliant orange. These colors are the result of the oxidation of iron-bearing minerals in the Hakatai Shale. It consists of lower and middle members that consist of bright-red, slope-forming, highly fractured, argillaceous mudstones and shale and an upper member composed of purple and red, cliff-forming, medium-grained sandstone. Its thickness, which apparently increases eastwards, varies from 137 to 300 m (449 to 984 ft). In general, the Hakatai Shale and associated strata of the Unkar Group rocks dip northeast (10–30°) toward normal faults that dip 60° or more toward the southwest. This can be seen at the Palisades fault in the eastern part of the main Unkar Group outcrop area (below East Rim). In addition, thick, prominent, and dark-colored basaltic sills and dikes cut across the purple to red to brilliant orange strata of the Hakatai Shale.

The bright orange-red slopes of the Hakatai Shale contrasts sharply against the grayish outcrops of the Bass Formation. The outcrop of the Hakatai Shale also contrasts greatly with the steep cliffs formed by Shinumo Quartzite as seen at the base of Isis Temple. In the central Grand Canyon north of Grand Canyon Village and viewed from the south at the South Rim, the bright orange-red unit can be seen below the Isis Temple and Cheops Pyramid landforms at the intersection of Bright Angel Canyon and Granite Gorge; the Bright Angel Trail from the South Rim traverses through the geographic region to the north, the North Kaibab Trail in Bright Angel Canyon.

The Hakatai Shale is part of a conformable sequence of sedimentary strata that comprise the Unkar Group. The Unkar Group is about 1,600 to 2,200 m (5,200 to 7,200 ft) thick and composed, in ascending order, of the Bass Formation, Hakatai Shale, Shinumo Quartzite, Dox Formation, and Cardenas Basalt. In ascending order, the Unkar Group is overlain by the Nankoweap Formation, about 113 to 150 m (371 to 492 ft) thick; the Chuar Group, about 1,900 m (6,200 ft) thick; and the Sixtymile Formation, about 60 m (200 ft) thick. The Grand Canyon Supergroup, of which the Unkar Group is the lowermost part, overlies deeply eroded granites, gneisses, pegmatites, and schists that comprise Vishnu Basement Rocks.

== Description ==
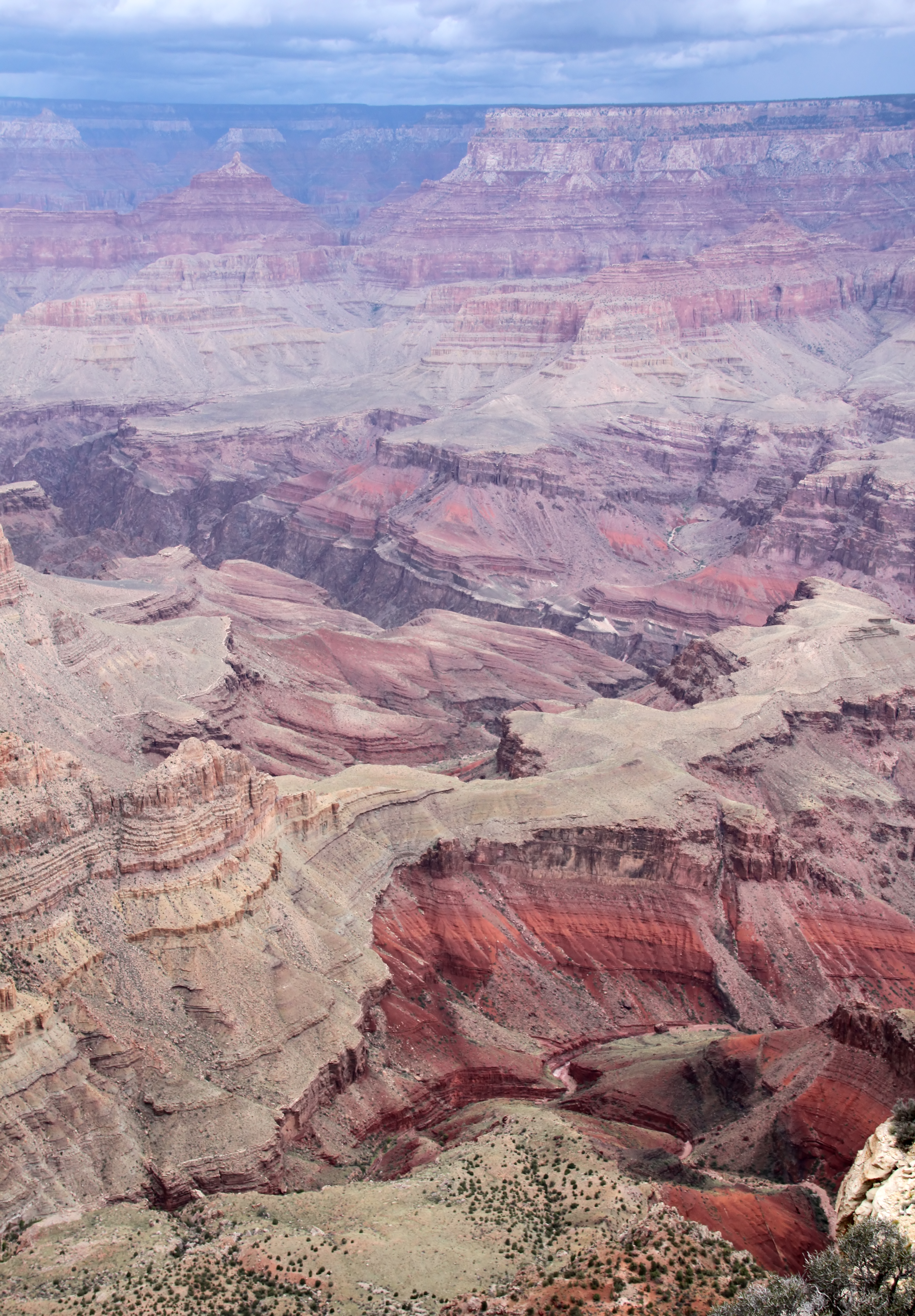
~closeup of bedding in Hakatai Shale (view downstream, ~west/northwest from Grandview Point, near East Rim, Grand Canyon)

Typically, the Hakatai Shale is subdivided into three informal members. In ascending order they are the Hance Rapids (lower), Cheops Pyramid (middle), and Stone Creek (upper) members. The total thickness of the Hakatai Shale varies from 135 m (443 ft) at Hance Rapids to nearly 300 m (980 ft) at the type section in Hakatai Canyon in the Shinumo Creek area.

First, the Hance Rapids (lower) member consists of purple to reddish-purple mudstone, interbedded sandy siltstone, and rare occurrences of thin-bedded subarkose- to quartz arenite. Beds of the lower member of the Hakatai Shale grade upward into the fine-grained middle member, with a boundary drawn at or very near their color change. Second, the Cheops Pyramid (middle) member consists of mudstone, siltstone, and subordinate sandy siltstone that exhibit a striking reddish-orange color. These distinctively red-colored strata are commonly mottled with small to large (up to 10 cm and more across), non-red, spherical to spheroidal reduction spots. These mottles have dark-gray to greenish-gray central nuclei that contain very dark gray to black central cores. Finally, the Stone Creek (upper) member of the Hakatai Shale consists of pale purple or lavender, fine- to coarse-grained, crossbedded coarse arkose.

Basaltic sills and dikes intrude all of the Unkar Group below the Cardenas Basalt. Sills intruded only the Bass Formation and Hakatai Shale. Dikes intrude the Hakatai Shale, Shinumo Quartzite, and Dox Formation. The sills range in thickness from 23 m (75 ft) at Hance Rapids, eastern Grand Canyon, to 300 m (980 ft) in Hakatai Canyon in the Shinumo Creek area. The feeder dikes to these sills are not exposed. However, the feeder dikes for the Cardenas Basalt can be traced, discontinuously, to within a few meters of its base. Adjacent to the sills, the Hatakai Shale has been altered to knotted hornfels containing porphyroblasts of andalusite and cordierite that have been replaced by muscovite and green chlorite, respectively.

== Contacts ==
In the eastern part of the Grand Canyon, the contact between the Hatakai Shale with underlying Bass Formation is typically gradational over an interval of a meter or so. For example, in Red Canyon, the contact consists of an interval in which stromatolitic limestone of the Bass Formation is intimately interbedded with coarse deposits of the overlying Hakatai Shale. In the eastern part of the Grand Canyon, the contact is sharp, but conformable.

The contact between the Hatakai Shale and the overlying Shinumo Quartzite is a distinct, significant disconformity. This disconformity is sharp and locally truncates cross-beds, and channel forms, within the sandstones of the underlying Hatakai Shale. Within the lower subarkose of the Shinumo Sandstone, a basal lag of conglomerate, which contains basement clasts up to 5 cm (2.0 in) across, lies on the eroded surface that forms this disconformity. This basal conglomerate contains quartzite clasts that lack any known equivalents in the Grand Canyon region. As documented by the dating of detrital zircons, this disconformity is estimated to represent a period of about 75 million years.

The contact between the Tapeats Sandstone and Hatakai Shale and the rest of the folded and faulted Unkar Group is a prominent angular unconformity, which is part of the Great Unconformity. The differential erosion of the Unkar Group left resistant beds of the Cardenas Basalt and Shinumo Quartzite as topographic highs, ancient monadnocks, that are now buried by sandstones, shales, and conglomerates of the Tapeats Sandstone. These monadnocks served locally as sources of coarse-grained sediments during the marine transgression that deposited the Tapeats Sandstone and other members of the Tonto Group. The contact between the Hatakai Shale and the Tapeats Sandstone forms part of a relatively flat surface that lies between the monadnocks.

== Fossils ==
Stromatolites have been found within spectacular exposures of the Hatakai Shale in Rodgers Canyon. At this outcrop, they occur in the transitional zone between it and the Bass Formation where stromatolitic carbonate beds are intimately interbedded with coarse deposits of the Hakatai Shale. The base of these deposits contains stromatolite onchaloids, small algal mounds, that are built upon coarse clasts of sandstone-conglomerate. In addition, the dark gray to black central cores of the reduction mottles found in the Cheops Pyramid (middle) member is possible of organic (stromatolitic?) origin.

A number of spurious and discredited reports about other types of fossils found in the Hatakai Shale have been made. In one case, apparent trails of metazoans were reported from the Hatakai Shale. However, these reported trace fossils are now regarded to be nonbiogenic pseudofossils.

== Depositional environments ==
The strata comprising the Hance Rapids (lower) member is interpreted to have accumulated beneath shallow, low-energy waters. The change from Bass Formation to the lower member likely represent the waning stages of marine deposition during which the Bass Formation accumulated. The Cheops Pyramid (middle) member is regarded to have accumulated either in a shallow, near-shore marine environment or in coastal plain mudflats, or deltas. The greenish gray reduction mottles are similar in nature to reduction mottles observed in the lower middle and upper members of the Dox Formation, which are regarded as having accumulated in nonmarine environments. The Stone Creek (upper) member is of probable marine deltaic origin.

== Age ==
The Hatakai Shale is between 1,253 and 1,104 million years old. It is younger than a layer of volcanic ash in the underlying Bass Formation that has been dated at 1,253 million years. In addition, the ^{40}Ar/^{39}Ar dating of detrital muscovite from the basal, Escalante Creek Member of the overlying Dox Formation indicates that it is younger than 1,140 million years. The overlying Dox Formation is older than the age of the Cardenas Basalt, which is 1,104 million years.

== Isis Temple-Cheops Pyramid horst ==
Isis Temple-Cheops Pyramid is a small horst, located close to the geographic center of the Grand Canyon. It is bordered on the east by the Bright Angel Fault and on the south by Granite Gorge; the Bright Angel Fault continues to the south-southwest across Granite Gorge and up Garden Creek, up the Bright Angel Trail to the South Rim. The north side of Isis Temple-Cheops Pyramid is bordered by the approximate east–west, Grandview Fault.

== See also ==
- Geology of the Grand Canyon area
- Great Unconformity
- Marine transgression
