= Shinumo Quartzite =

Mesoproterozoic rock formation in the Grand Canyon, Arizona

- Stratigraphic range: Meso-Proterozoic: between 1,170 and 1,150 Ma
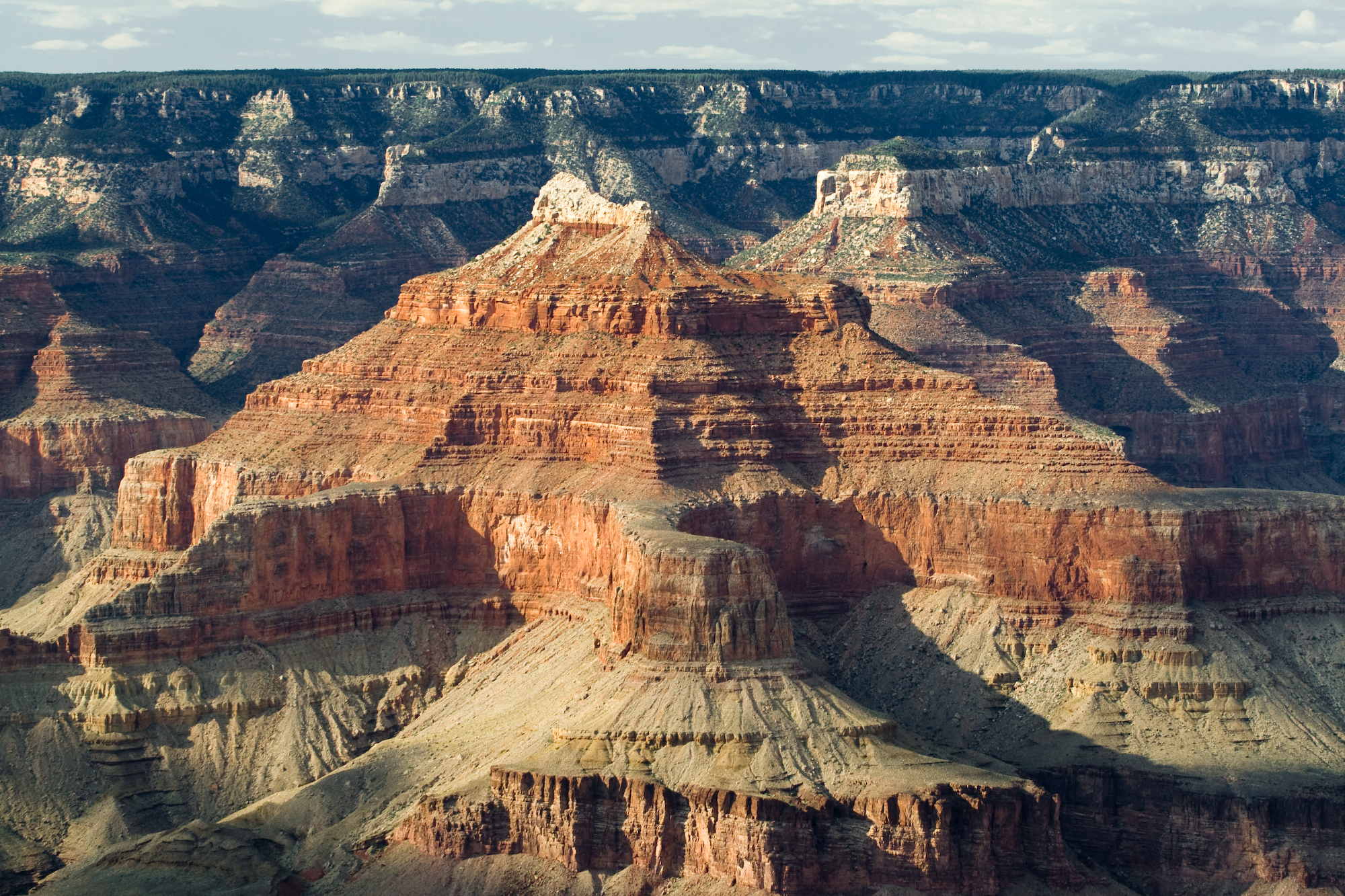
- (photo bottom)-Isis Temple-monadnock—Medium tannish vertical cliffs of Shinumo Quartzite-(at angular dip) below drab-greenish slopes of Bright Angel Shale
- Type: Geological formation
- Unit of: Unkar Group
- Underlies: Dox Formation
- Overlies: Hakatai Shale
- Thickness: 350 to 410 m (1,150 to 1,350 ft)

Lithology
- Primary: quartzite
- Other: conglomeratic sandstone, quartzitic sandstone, arkosic sandstone, mudstone

Location
- Region: Arizona, Grand Canyon, Isis Temple region, southwest Bright Angel Canyon, at north side, Granite Gorge, and along Colorado River and tributary canyons
- Country: United States

Type section
- Named for: Shinumo Canyon
- Named by: Noble
- Year defined: 1914

The Shinumo Quartzite also known as the Shinumo Sandstone is a Mesoproterozoic rock formation, which outcrops in the eastern Grand Canyon, Coconino County, Arizona (Northern Arizona). It is the 3rd member of the 5-unit Unkar Group. The Shinumo Quartzite consists of a series of massive, cliff-forming sandstones and sedimentary quartzites. Its cliffs contrast sharply with the stair-stepped topography of typically brightly-colored (orange, red, yellow, etc) strata of the underlying slope-forming Hakatai Shale. Overlying the Shinumo, dark green to black, fissile, slope-forming shales of the Dox Formation create a well-defined notch. It and other formations of the Unkar Group occur as isolated fault-bound remnants along the main stem of the Colorado River and its tributaries in Grand Canyon.

Typically, the Shinumo Quartzite and associated strata of the Unkar Group dip northeast (10°–30°) toward normal faults that dip 60+° toward the southwest. This can be seen at the Palisades fault in the eastern part of the main Unkar Group outcrop area (below East Rim).

The Shinumo Quartzite is a middle member of the Unkar Group. The Unkar Group is about 1,600 to 2,200 m (5,200 to 7,200 ft) thick and composed of, in ascending order, the Bass Formation, Hakatai Shale, Shinumo Quartzite, Dox Formation, and Cardenas Basalt.

The Unkar Group consists of a sequence of sedimentary rocks that accumulated in a variety of environments ranging from fluvial to shallow-marine. Overall, the strata within it are conformable with the exception of a significant disconformity between the Hakatai Shale and Shinumo Quartzite. The Unkar Group is overlain in ascending order by the Nankoweap Formation, about 113 to 150 m (371 to 492 ft) thick; the Chuar Group, about 1,900 m (6,200 ft) thick; and the Sixtymile Formation, about 60 m (200 ft) thick. The Unkar Group, as the base section of the Grand Canyon Supergroup, overlies deeply eroded granites, gneisses, pegmatites, and schists that comprise Vishnu Basement Rocks.

== Description ==
In sharp contrast to argillaceous strata above and below it, the Shinumo Quartzite consists predominately of beds of red, brown or purple sedimentary quartzites that are firmly, to extremely well cemented by silica, and characterized by poorly developed bedding. It also contains beds of massive white, red or purple sandstone and conglomeratic sandstone. One conglomeratic sandstone layer that lies about 21 m (69 ft) above the base of the Shinumo Quartzite near the South Kaibab trail contains jasper pebbles.

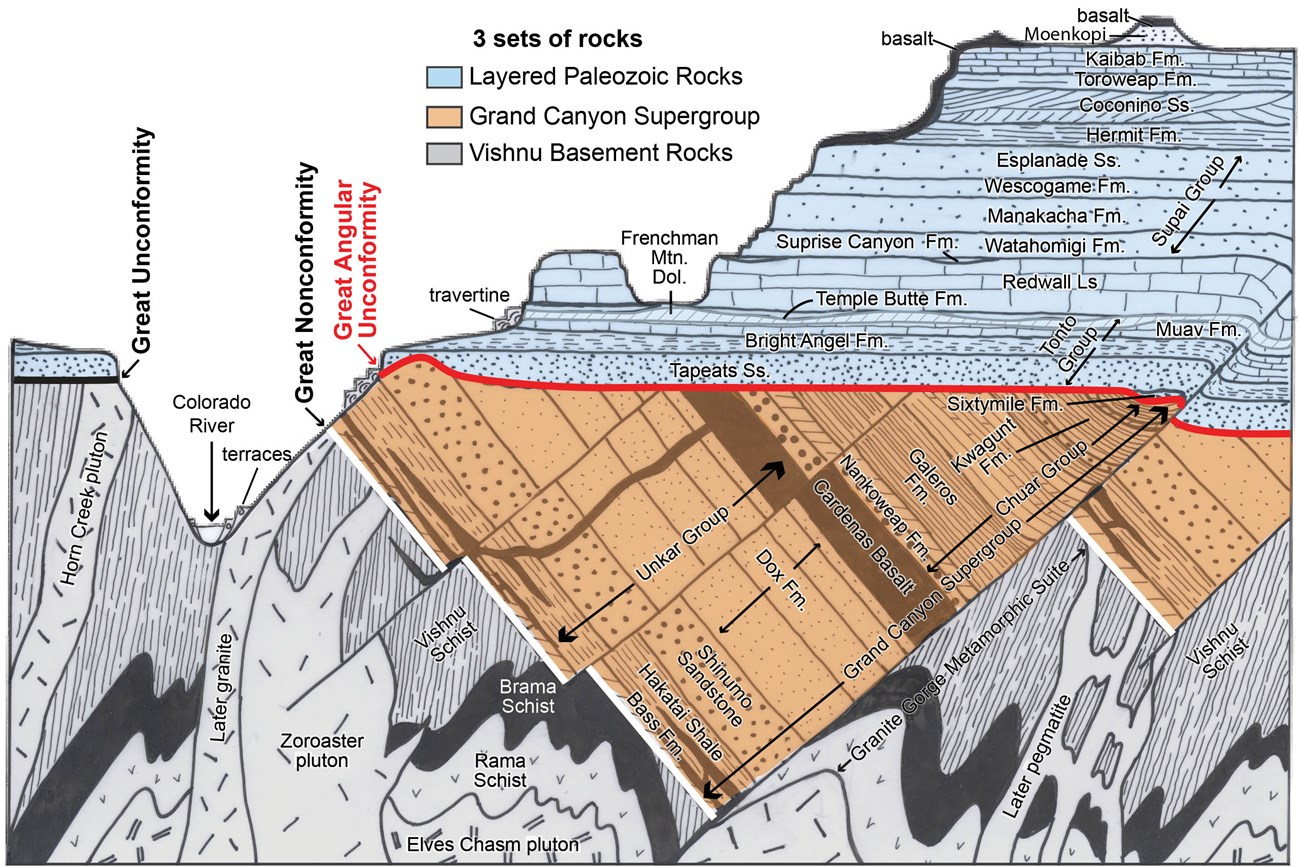
Figure 1. A geologic cross section of the Grand Canyon.

Typically, the Shinumo Quartzite has been subdivided into four poorly defined, unnamed members. First, the basal lower member consisting of purplish arkosic conglomeratic sandstone. Unlike the rest of the Shinumo Quartzite, it contains quartzite and granite gravels up to 5 cm (2.0 in) in diameter. As in the case of the Hotauta Conglomerate, the quartzite gravel of the lower member lacks any known equivalents in the Grand Canyon region.

Second, the lower-middle member is composed of purple cross-bedded quartzite, sometimes is subdivided into two units, and overlies the lower member. The purple quartzites of the lower-middle member exhibit crisp, well-defined reduction spots. Third, the upper-middle member is composed of "rusty red" quartzite and overlies the lower-middle member. The "rusty-red" quartzite of the upper-middle member grades downward into the lower-middle member through an interval of interbedded purple and red-brown quartzite. Their colors and cementation appear to be the result of ground or connate water alteration after their deposition.

Finally, the upper member of the Shinumo Quartzite is composed of reddish brown and locally purple sandstone and an overlying well-cemented gray quartzite. The Shinumo Quartzite is characterized as a quartzite, but the gray quartzite within the upper member of the Shinumo Quartzite contains mudstone-rich intervals. In addition, the gray quartzite was subjected to cementation by silica and bleaching that removed its original reddish brown and purple hematite pigments, after its deposition.

Basaltic sills and dikes intrude all formations of the Unkar Group below the Cardenas Lava. The Hakatai Shale, Shinumo Quartzite, and Dox Formation are intruded by these dikes. They can be traced, discontinuously, to within a few meters of the base of the Cardenas Lava.

== Sedimentary structures ==
The Shinumo Quartzite exhibits a variety of sedimentary structures. The sandstones of the lower and lower-middle members exhibit centimeter- to meter-scale planar tabular cross-stratification and trough cross-beds. These cross beds record north-directed paleocurrents along with subordinate bidirectional paleocurrents. The upper-middle member exhibits abundant cross beds, clay galls, and mudcracks. The sandstones of the upper member exhibit trough cross-beds, suggesting a more northerly transport direction. The sandstone and quartzite beds of the upper member exhibit an abundance of complexly contorted, gnarly bedded, fluid expulsion structures and dramatic convolute bedding. The beds that exhibit these soft-sediment deformation structures are meters- to tens-of-meters thick. They are cited as evidence for frequent earthquake activity and fluid migration during the deposition of the Shinumo Quartzite. These deformed beds can be seen at river level in the vicinity of Nevilles Rapid, (List of Colorado River rapids), at river mile 75.

== Thickness ==
The Shinumo Quartzite ranges in thickness from 330 m (1,080 ft) in the Bright Angel Canyon area to 345 m (1,132 ft) at Papago Creek and 405 m (1,329 ft) in the Shinumo Creek area. In the Bright Angel Canyon area, the upper member is about 18 m (59 ft) thick, the upper middle member is about 80 m (260 ft) thick, and the lower middle member is about 130 m (430 ft) thick.

== Contacts ==
The contact of the Shinumo Quartzite with the Hakatai Shale is the only documented unconformity that has been found within the Unkar Group. This unconformity truncates across beds and channel deposits of the Hakatai Shale. The relief at this unconformity is small, being about 10 m (33 ft). The Shinumo Quartzite overlying this unconformity consists of arkosic conglomeratic sandstone that contains quartzite and granite pebbles.

Within the Unkar Group, the upper contact of the Shinumo Quartzite with the Dox Formation appears to be gradational and is marked by a change in topographic expression and color. The basal 12 m (39 ft) of the Dox Formation directly overlying Shinumo Quartzite consists of predominantly dark green to black, fissile, slope-forming shale that contains thin sandstone beds. This shale makes a distinct notch between the resistant cliff-forming quartzites of the Shinumo Quartzite underlying them and resistant cliff-forming arkosic sandstones of the Dox Formation overlying them. The change in topographic expression, color, and the facies change, from quartz arenite, to mudstone and fine-grained arkose – is gradational.

Between the three-member Tonto Group (above) and the Shinumo Quartzite, and the rest of the folded and faulted Unkar Group, is a prominent angular unconformity, which is part of the Great Unconformity. Though this surface is typically a plane, differential erosion (also areal erosion) of the tilted strata of the Unkar Group left resistant beds of the Cardenas Basalt and Shinumo Quartzite as ancient hills, called monadnocks, that are up to 240 m (790 ft) tall. Thin drapes of Tapeats Sandstone of the Tonto Group now cover most of these ancient monadnocks. However, a few of these monadnocks protrude further up into the Bright Angel Shale (Isis Temple prominence example). These monadnocks served locally as sources of coarse-grained sediments that accumulated during the marine transgression to form the Tonto Group.

== Fossils ==
No fossils have been reported from the Shinumo Quartzite.

== Depositional environments ==
The sedimentary strata comprising the Shinumo Quartzite are inferred to have accumulated in a variety of environments. The lower member is regarded to have been deposited by ancient river systems and later, in coastal tidal flats. The lower-middle, and upper-middle members are argued to have accumulated in nearshore marine environments and coastal tidal and supratidal flats. The upper member is inferred to have accumulated in the delta plain, delta front, and mouth-bar of an ancient delta. The deformed strata of the upper member are interpreted as evidence of reoccurring earthshocks along regional fault and fold systems that were active during its deposition. The contact between the Shinumo Quartzite and Dox Formation indicates a shift from deposition in coastal deltas to fluvial deposition by a large river system.

== Age ==
The age of the Shinumo Quartzite is approximately known. Based upon recent dates of volcanic ash layers, detrital zircon grains, and detrital mica flakes, geologists agree that the Unkar Group was deposited between about 1254 and 1100 Ma. The Hakatai Shale, Shinumo Quartzite, and Dox Formation samples yield clusters of zircon as young as 1170 Ma. Thus, these strata must be younger than 1170 Ma. The Dox Formation, which overlies the Shinumo Quartzite is estimated to have accumulated between 1150 and 1140 and 1100 Ma. Thus, the Shinumo Quartzite must date to between 1170 and 1150 to 1140 Ma. This would suggest that the disconformity at the base of the Shinumo Quartzite is a minor one.

== See also ==
- Geology of the Grand Canyon area
- Great Unconformity
