= Cardenas Basalt =

Rock formation in the Grand Canyon, Arizona

Cardenas Basalt Cardenas Lava(s)
- Stratigraphic range: Mesoproterozoic, 1,104 Ma
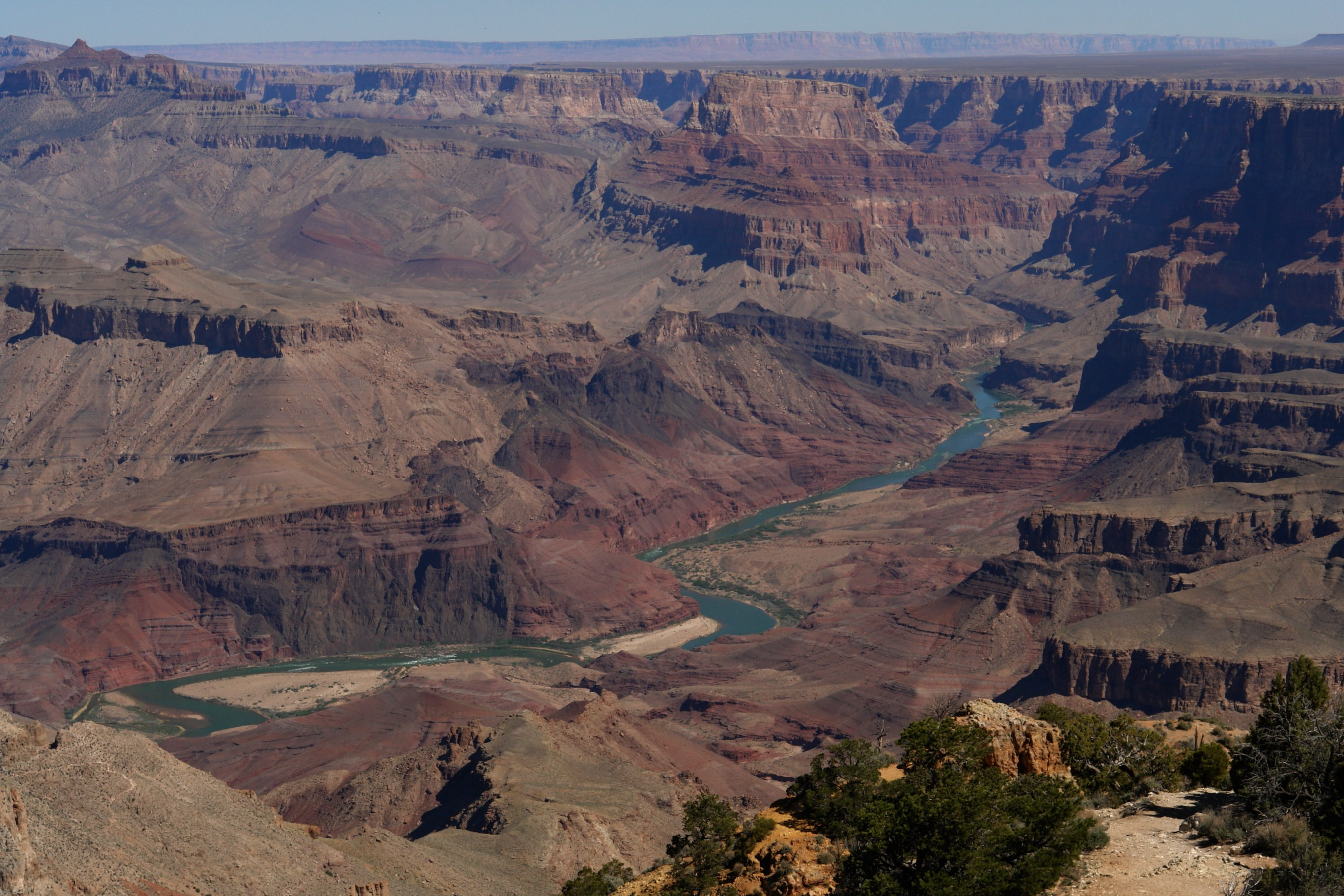
- black-Cardenas Basalt cliffs on the Colorado River. The squarish cliff is the down-dropped Tanner Graben, of Cardenas Basalt.
- Type: Geological formation
- Unit of: Unkar Group
- Underlies: Nankoweap Formation
- Overlies: Dox Formation
- Thickness: 300 m (980 ft) approximate maximum

Lithology
- Primary: basalt
- Other: hyaloclastite, sandstone, and lapillite

Location
- Region: Arizona-east Grand Canyon; Lava Butte region on Colorado River, near Lipan Point
- Country: United States-(Southwestern United States)

Type section
- Named for: Cardenas Butte and Cardenas Creek
- Named by: Keyes (1938) and Ford et al. (1972)

The Cardenas Basalt, also known as either the Cardenas Lava or Cardenas Lavas, is a rock formation that outcrops over an area of about 310 km^{2} (120 mi^{2}) in the eastern Grand Canyon, Coconino County, Arizona. The lower part of the Cardenas Basalt forms granular talus slopes. Its upper part forms nearly continuous low cliffs that are parallel to the general course of the Colorado River. The most complete, readily accessible, and easily studied exposure of the Cardenas Basalt lies in Basalt Canyon. This is also its type locality.

The Cardenas Basalt is part of the Unkar Group. The Unkar Group is about 1,600 to 2,200 m (5,200 to 7,200 ft) thick and composed, in ascending order, of the Bass Formation, Hakatai Shale, Shinumo Quartzite, Dox Formation, and Cardenas Basalt. In ascending order, the Cardenas Basalt is overlain by the Nankoweap Formation, about 113 to 150 m (371 to 492 ft) thick; the Chuar Group, about 1,900 m (6,200 ft) thick; and the Sixtymile Formation, about 60 m (200 ft) thick. The Grand Canyon Supergroup, of which the Unkar Group is the lowermost part, overlies deeply eroded granites, gneisses, pegmatites, and schists that comprise Vishnu Basement Rocks.

The Cardenas Basalt has also been called the Rama Formation. However this name, which was originally applied to the dikes and sills intruding strata underlying the Cardenas Basalt has been formally abandoned in the geological literature.

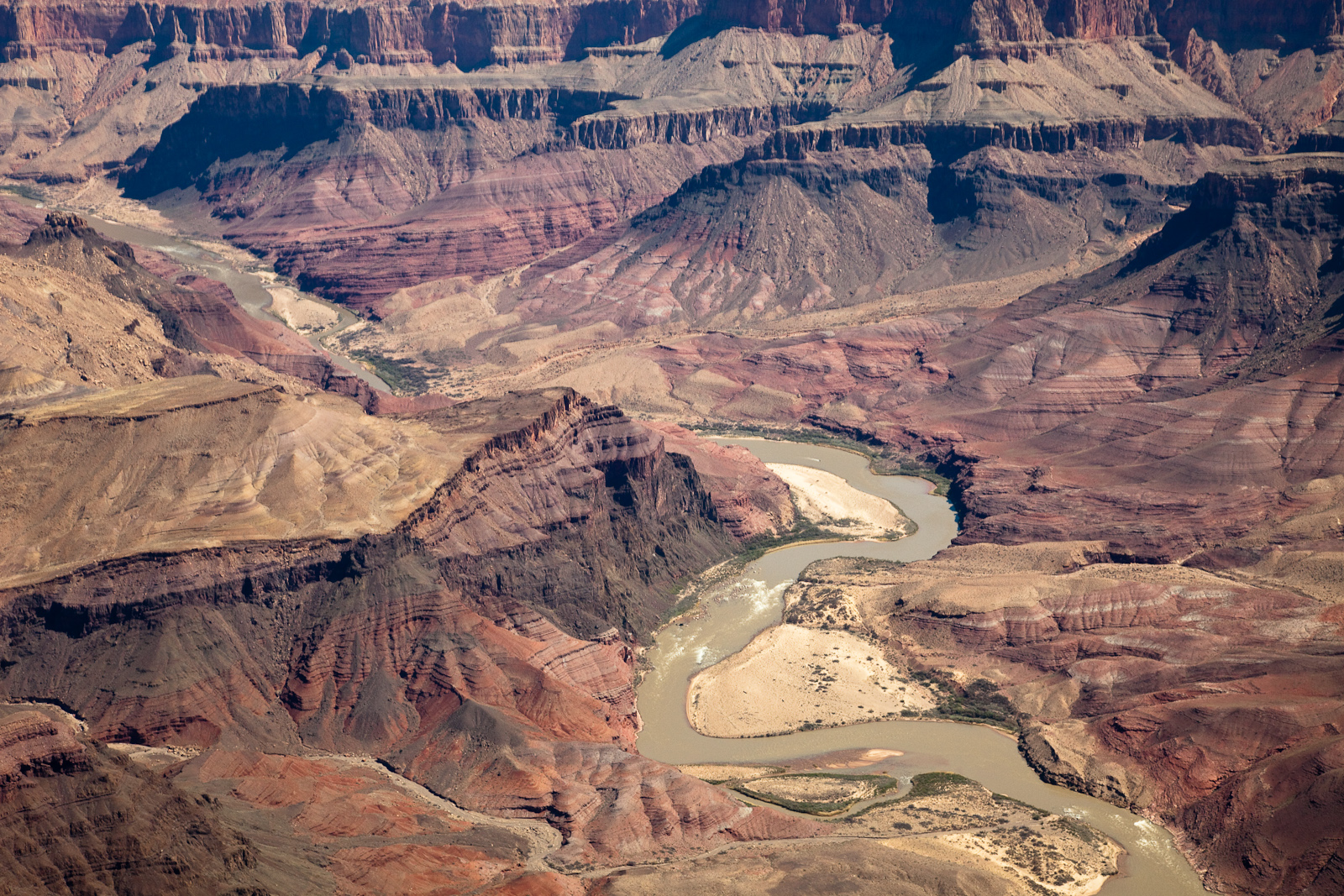
Relationship of units 5 & 4 of the Unkar Group. Note horizontal bedding (with interbedding) of the Dox Formation; also cliffs of Tapeats Sandstone below greenish slopes of the Bright Angel Shale.

== Description ==
The Cardenas Basalt is about 300 m (980 ft) thick and is typically divided into lower and upper units. The lower unit ranges in thickness from 75 to 90 m (246 to 295 ft) and forms low, talus covered slopes. It consists of complexly interbedded, thin, and discontinuous beds of basalt, hyaloclastite, and sandstone. Within the lower part of the Cardenas Basalt, the basaltic lavas are highly fractured and weather into rubble that is about 10 to 30 cm (3.9 to 11.8 in) in diameter. The lava within this unit consists of pahoehoe lava flows of olivine-rich basalt. Within the lower part of the Cardenas Basalt, the lava is highly altered and might have been glassy at one time. Near the top of the lower unit the basalt is more massive and less altered. The hyaloclastite is highly altered, and contains secondary chlorite, epidote, talc, and zeolites. Although this unit is highly altered and weathered, many of the primary features are preserved. Thin discontinuous sandstone beds are interbedded with lava flows and hyaloclastite. The brown, maroon, purple sandstones consist of texturally immature, planar-bedded, poorly sorted quartz and feldspar in a matrix of mica and clay. The coarser grains range from medium sand to silt.

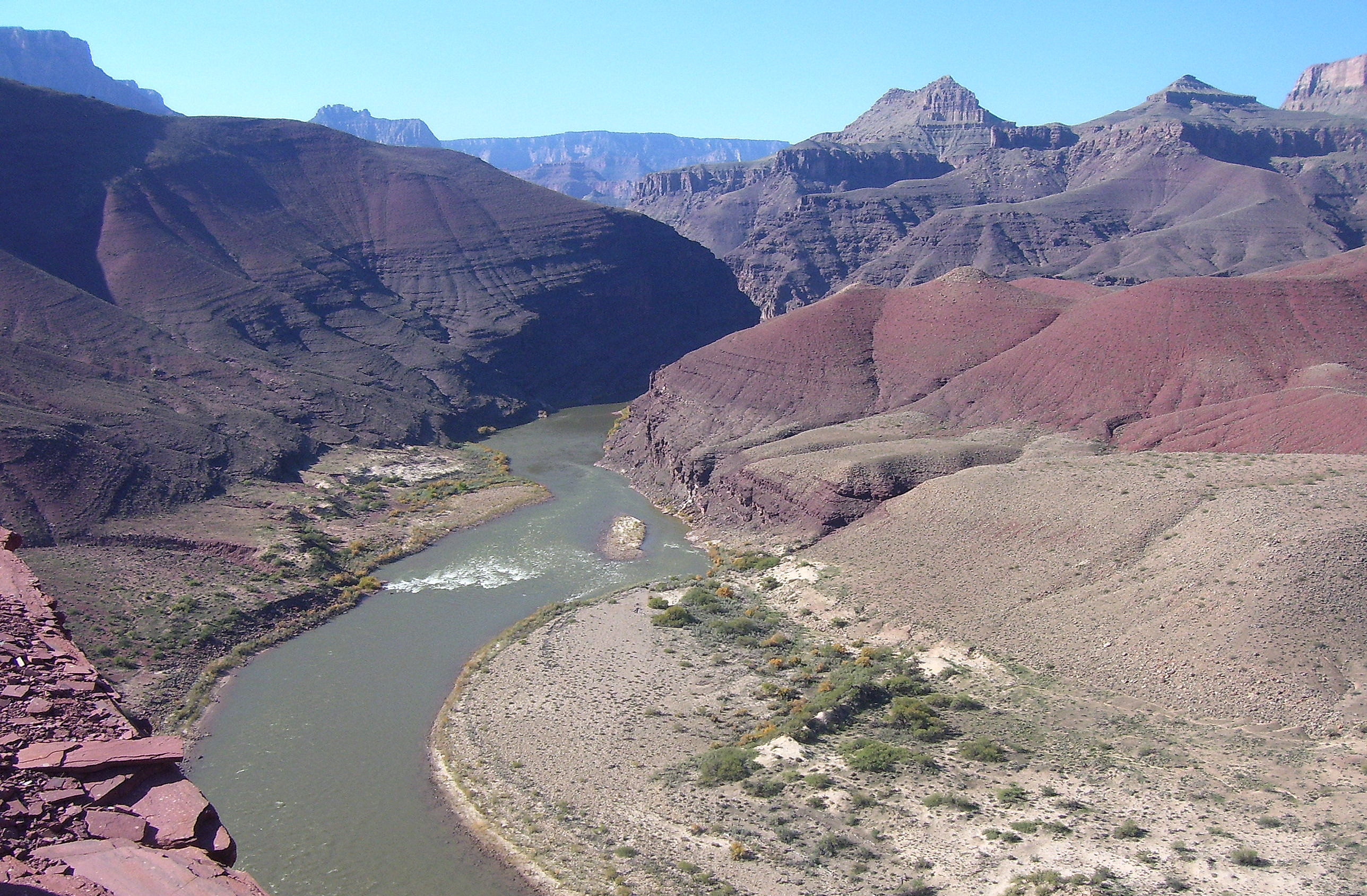
Cardenas Basalt, riverside-(unspecified milepost on river). Reddish Dox Formation is at the west, basalt east. (downstream view, ~west/southwest) (high resolution expandable photo – Note: massive sections of Cardenas on both sides of river)

The upper unit of the Cardenas Basalt is a series of cliff-forming basaltic and andesitic lava flows that are interbedded with beds of breccia, sandstone, and lapillite. It is about 200 m (660 ft) thick and contains four to six, prominent lava flows that range in composition from quartz tholeiite to tholeiitic andesite (icelandite). Some of the lava flows are fan-jointed, ropy, and have porphyritic to aphanitic and vesicular textures. The sandstones within the upper part of the Cardenas Basalt contain eroded fragments of lava and have been baked by overlying lava flows. The lapillite bed ranges in thickness from a few meters to several tens of meters and consists of scoriaceous lapilli, volcanic blocks, and volcanic bombs.

The basaltic and andesitic dikes and sills that occur within the strata underlying the Cardenas Basalt are similar in mineralogy and chemistry to the Cardenas volcanic rocks. This suggests that these intrusive and extrusive rocks are coeval and share a common source. The sills range in thickness from a few tens of meters to as thick as 300 m. The dikes typically are much thinner and locally follow fault planes.

== Nature of contacts ==
The basal contact of the Cardenas Basalt with the underlying Dox Formation is smooth, planar, parallel to bedding and locally interfingering. In places the sandstones of the Dox Formation have small folds and convolutions that are indicative of soft sediment deformation. In addition, in places, the uppermost 60 cm (2.0 ft) of the Dox Formation is mildly baked. A thin lava flow occurs within the uppermost part of the Dox Formation. Thus, the contact between the Cardenas Lavas and the Dox Formation is conformable and interfingering. This indicates that sands were still being deposited when the first lavas erupted and that deposition occurred during the transition from the accumulation of Dox Formation to Cardenas Basalt.

The contact between the Cardenas Basalt and the overlying Nankoweap Formation is an erosion surface that is a disconformity or even a slight angular unconformity. Locally, the contact is a low relief erosional surface associated with a thin weathering zone developed in the lavas of the Cardenas Basalt. Along the length of the outcrop of this unconformity, it cuts as much as 100 m (330 ft) down into the Cardenas Basalt. The lowest part of the Nankoweap Formation consists of a basal conglomerate that is composed chiefly of gravel derived from the Cardenas Basalt.

The contact between the Tapeats Sandstone and the Cardenas Basalt and rest of the folded and faulted Unkar Group is a prominent angular unconformity. The differential erosion of the Unkar Group left resistant beds of the Cardenas Basalt and Shinumo Quartzite as topographic highs, ancient monadnocks, that are now buried by sandstones, shales, and conglomerates of the Tonto Group. These monadnocks served locally as sources of coarse-grained sediments during the marine transgression that deposited the Tapeats Sandstone and other members of the Tonto Group.

== Fossils ==
No fossils have been reported from the sediments interbedded within the Cardenas Basalt.

== Depositional environment ==
The lava flows of the Cardenas Basalt represent the subaerial eruption of basaltic and andesitic magma. The interbedded sandstones and hyaloclastites provide evidence that these eruptions occurred in wet coastal environments such as river deltas or tidal flats. The coarseness of the lapillites in the upper unit indicates that the volcanic vents from which this material erupted were close to present day outcrops. The character of the individual flow units suggest that the volcanic strata accumulated at a slightly greater rate than basin subsidence.

== Age ==
Geologists have attempted to date the Cardenas Basalt for many years. On the basis of other geologic criteria, geologists have found that the dates, which range from 700 to 1,000 million years ago, obtained for the age of the Cardenas Basalt and upper age of the Unkar Group were too young and something was clearly perturbing the dating systematics. The current interpretation is that the deposition of the overlying Chuar Group in a marine setting disrupted the potassium-argon (K-Ar) radiometric system. Apparently, fluids associated with the deposition of the Chuar Group have altered the older Cardenas Basalt, partially degraded the minerals, and therefore disrupted the K-Ar systematics. Using newer dating techniques and approaches not available to earlier geologists, the Cardenas Basalt and intrusive sills have been re-dated. New data acquired using newer dating techniques and approaches, indicate that the Cardenas Basalt erupted about 1,104 million years ago. This date marks the end of Unkar time.

== Tanner Trail, Lava Butte ==
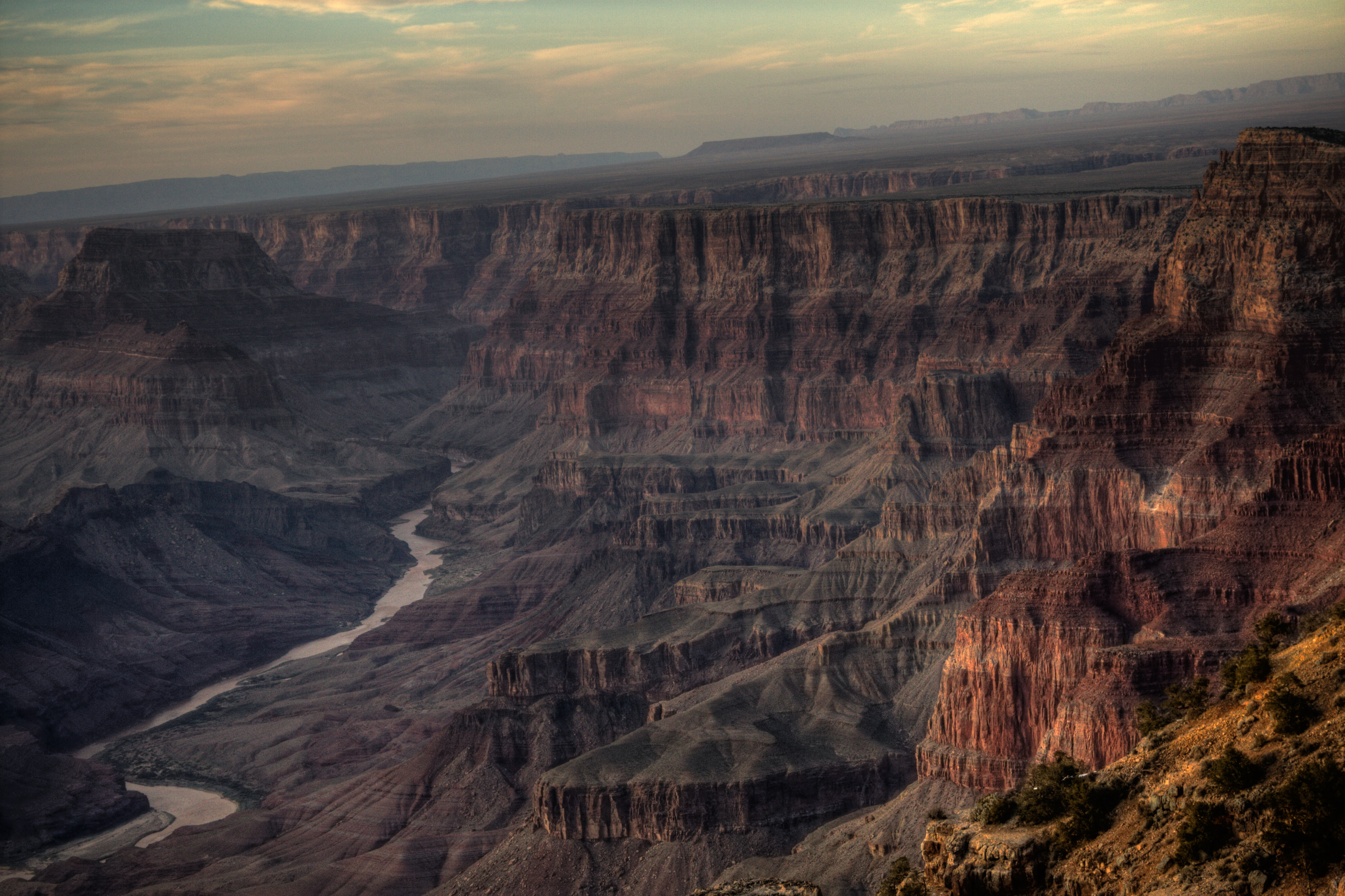
Dark-black Lava Butte in front of the massive Chuar Butte

The Tanner Trail from Desert View point region to the Colorado River, has views north to the Colorado River and Lava Butte, which is made of the Cardenas Basalt and is one of the ancient topographic highs (monadnocks) and lies directly north. Temple Butte, the Palisades of the Desert, is on the East Rim, to the right (east) of Lava Butte. The buttes lie on the west bank of the Colorado River as it flows due-south on the east, southeast side of the Kaibab Plateau, (Cape Royal at Walhalla Plateau). The Colorado River immediately turns due-west here to soon enter the Granite Gorge region (East Inner Gorge), which is made up of the Vishnu Basement Rocks.

== Gallery ==
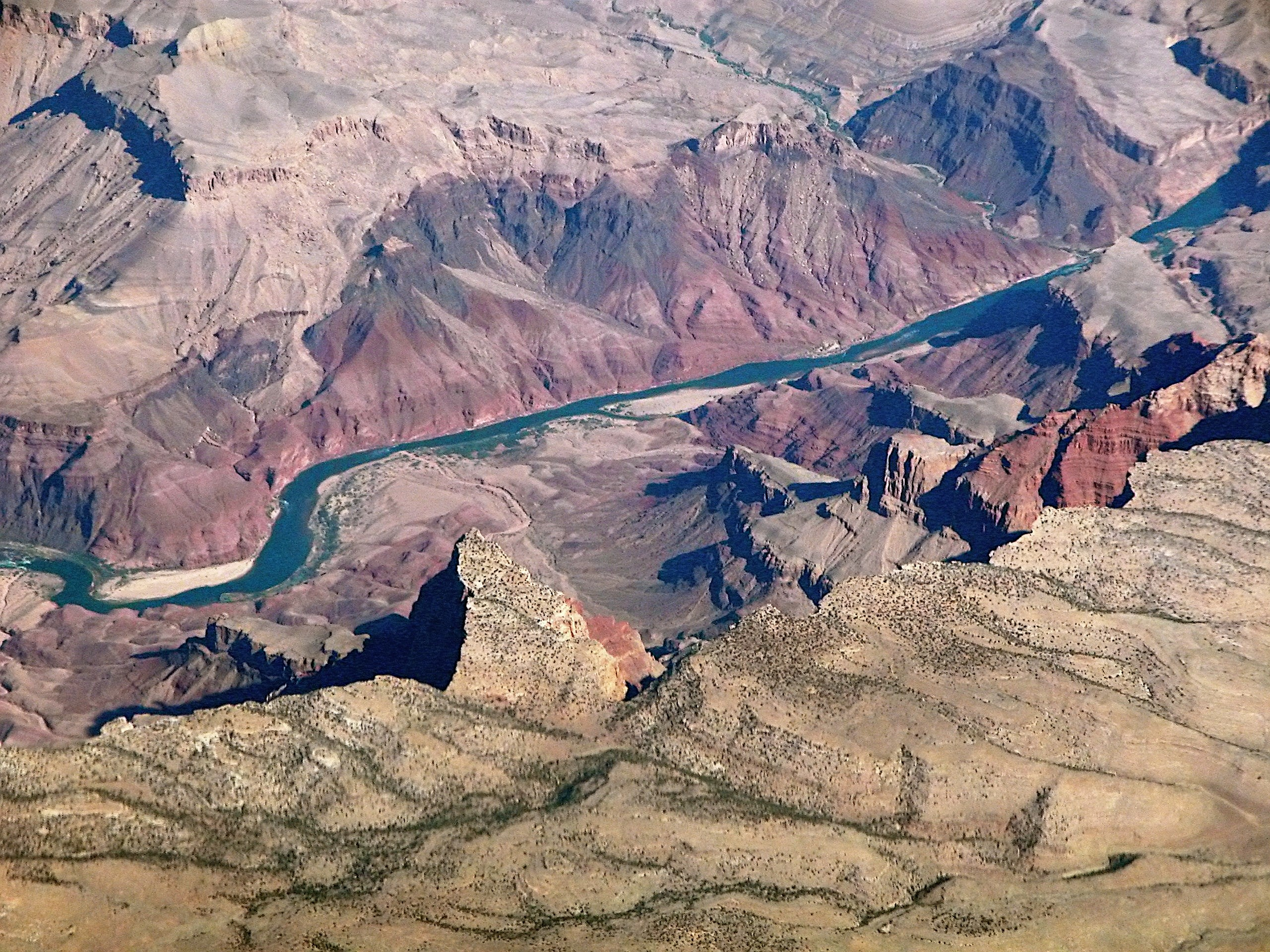
View below Comanche Point (Desert View region), East Rim. A 3-mile stretch of the Colorado River from Lava Creek, with Lava Butte, of Cardenas Basalt, and river flowing southwest, to just north of Basalt Creek (in the Dox Formation, underlying the Cardenas Basalt). (Tanner Graben at Tanner Rapid at bottom-left.)

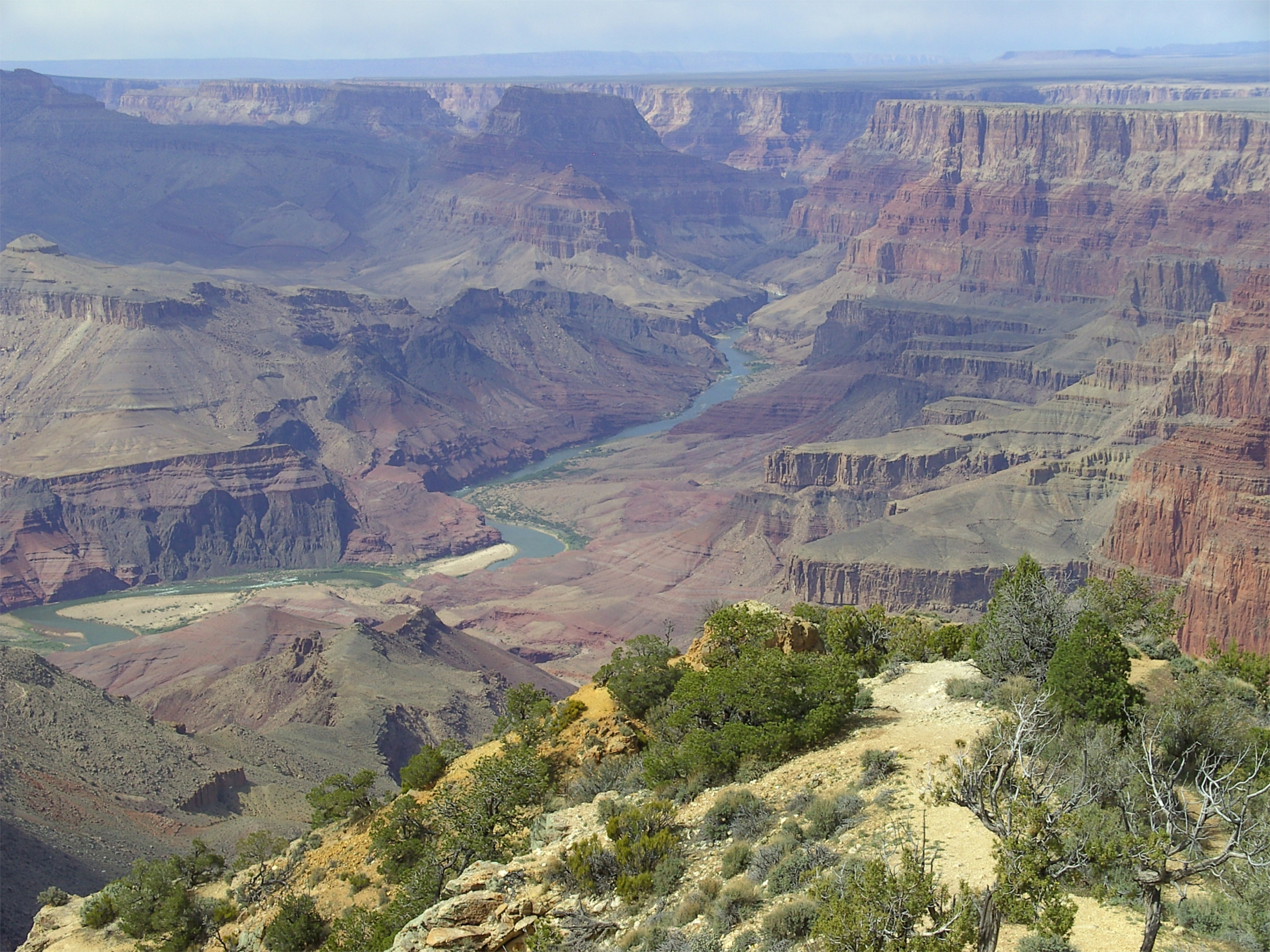
Black basalt cliff of Tanner Graben-(left edge, photo, down-dropped, north side of Colorado River, with multi-banded, horizontal Nankoweap Formation on top), site of Tanner Canyon, opposite, and Tanner Rapid at cliff base)

== See also ==
- Geology of the Grand Canyon area
- Great Unconformity
- Tanner Graben
