= Grand Canyon Supergroup =

Sequence of sedimentary strata

- Stratigraphic range: Meso- and Neo-Proterozoic, between 1,250 to 650–700 Ma
- Type: Supergroup
- Sub-units: Chuar Group; Nankoweap Formation; Unkar Group
- Underlies: Tonto Group, which is separated from it by the Great Unconformity
- Overlies: Vishnu Basement Rocks
- Thickness: 11,500 ft (3,500 m) to 13,100 ft (4,000 m)

Location
- Region: Southwestern United States
- Country: United States

Type section
- Named for: Grand Canyon
- Named by: (Walcott, 1883, 1894)

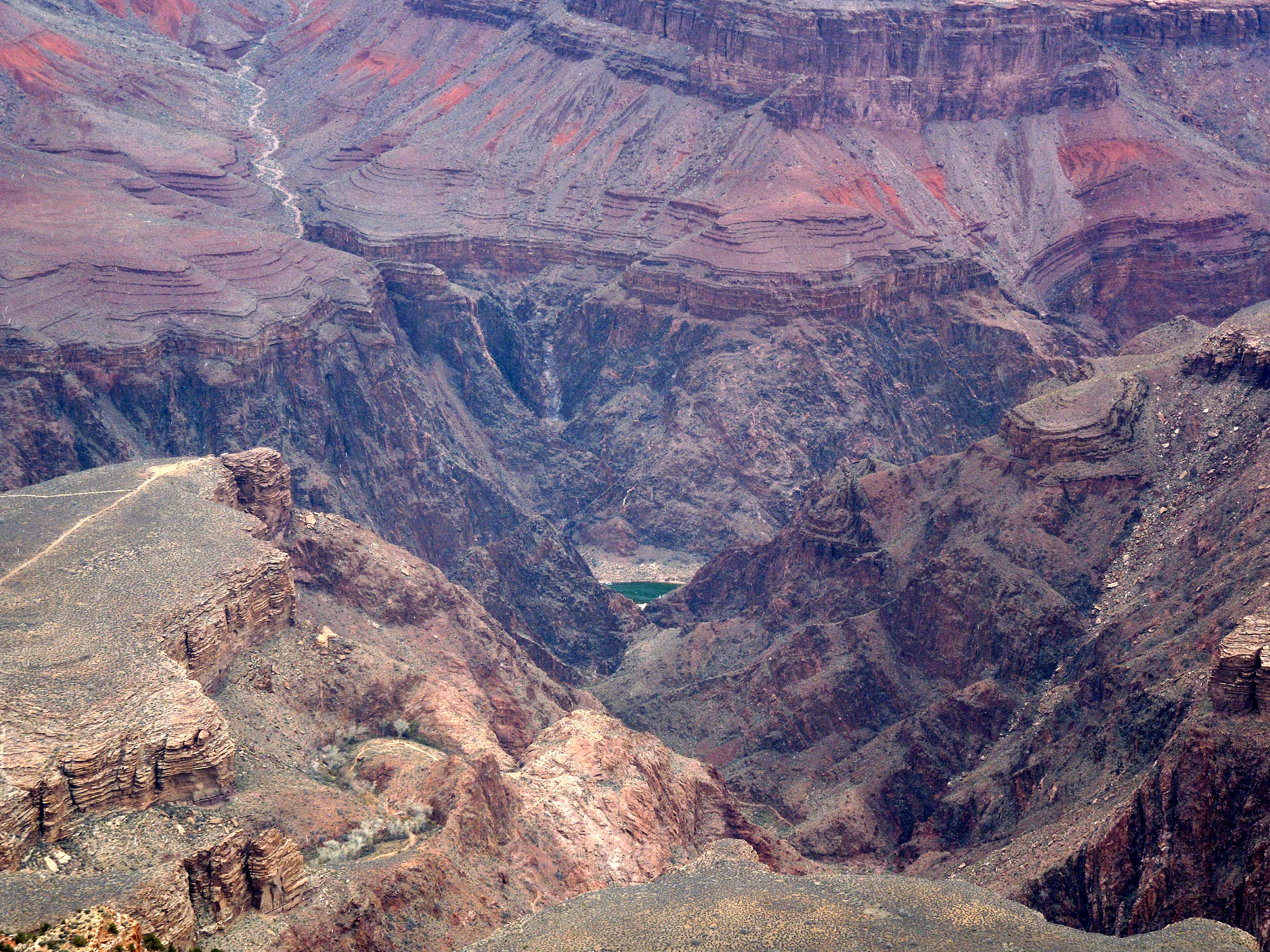
A view looking north. Unkar Group units lying below the Isis Temple/Cheops Pyramid landforms: Shinumo Quartzite cliffs (lower part shown on top of photo), above Hakatai Shale (red-orange-purple slopes), above Bass Formation(finely-layered, dark slopes), sitting on top of (base units). Vishnu Basement Rocks (black stratum) within the Granite Gorge and side canyons.

The Grand Canyon Supergroup is a Mesoproterozoic to a Neoproterozoic sequence of sedimentary strata, partially exposed in the eastern Grand Canyon of Arizona. This group comprises the Unkar Group, Nankoweap Formation, Chuar Group and the Sixtymile Formation, which overlie Vishnu Basement Rocks. Several notable landmarks of the Grand Canyon, such as the Isis Temple and Cheops Pyramid, and the Apollo Temple, are surface manifestations of the Grand Canyon Supergroup.

== Geology ==
The Grand Canyon Supergroup uncomformably overlies the Vishnu Basement Rocks but was never subjected to metamorphism. The units of the Supergroup were faulted and then tilted from 10 to 15 degrees.

A section of the Unkar Group members is visible north of Grand Canyon Village, on the South Rim; specifically at the intersection of the Bright Angel Fault and the Grandview–Phantom Fault (which cuts through Phantom Creek), on the North Rim (at the north side of Granite Gorge).

The majority of the Grand Canyon Supergroup geologic members are found in the south and southwest stretch of the Colorado River starting from Marble Canyon, traverses the southeast perimeter of the Kaibab Plateau, and flows northeasterly entering Granite Gorge and regions of the Vishnu Basement Rocks. Here, the river leaves the last of the Unkar Group's lower-unit members behind. Other sections of the Unkar Group reappear downstream due to the general faulting of the Grand Canyon.

Geologic Sequence of the Super Group

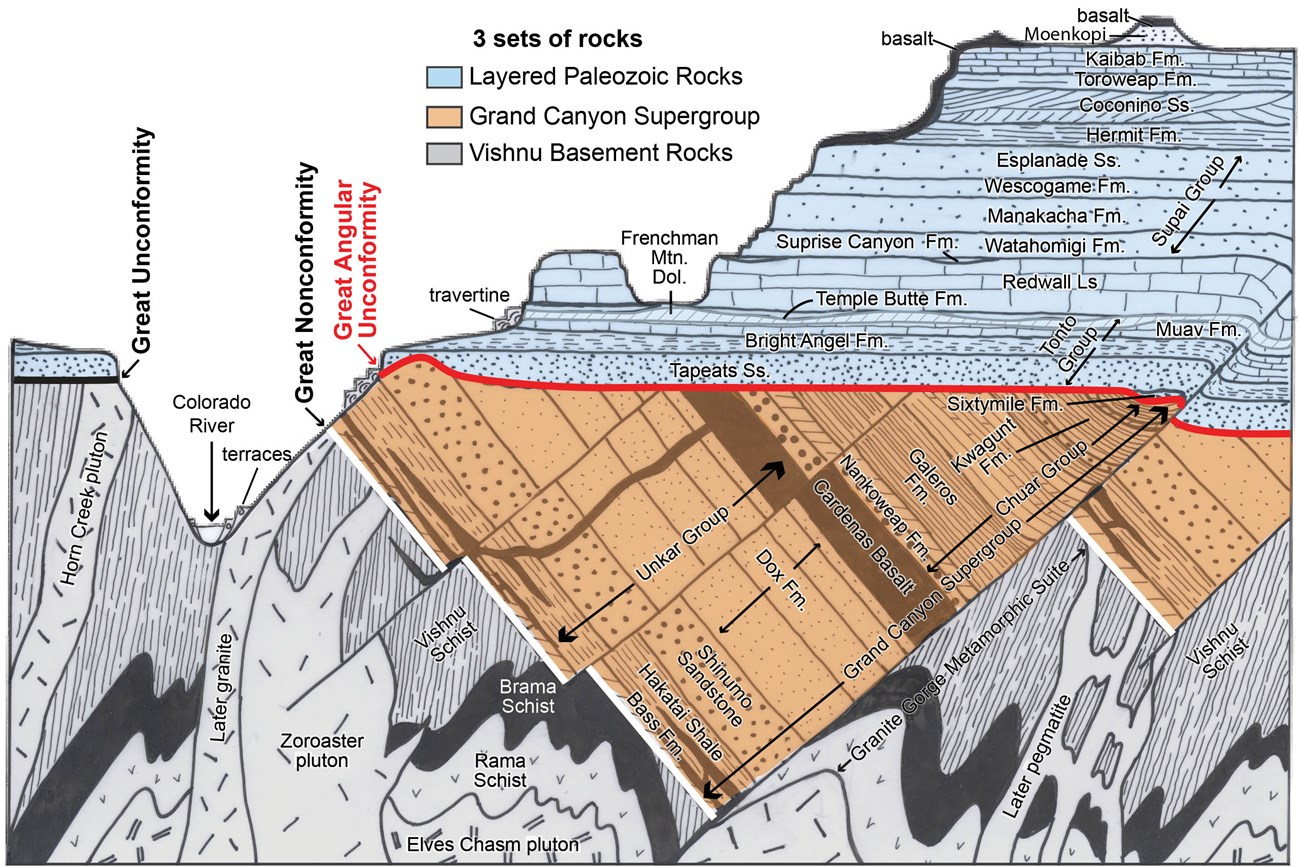
Geologic stratigraphic column of strata exposed in and near the Grand Canyon showing stratigraphic units and major unconformities

The units of the Grand Canyon Supergroup in increasing age:

Chuar Group

- Kwagunt Formation
- Galeros Formation
- Nankoweap Formation

Unkar Group

- Cardenas Basalt, youngest, Meso-Proterozoic 1070 ± 70 million years
- Dox Formation
- Shinumo Quartzite
- Diabase dikes and sills–(dikes and sills, lateral 25 feet (7.6 m) thickness max; associated with Cardenas Basalt)
- Hakatai Shale
- Bass Formation, (begins at ~1250 Ma)

=== Fossils ===
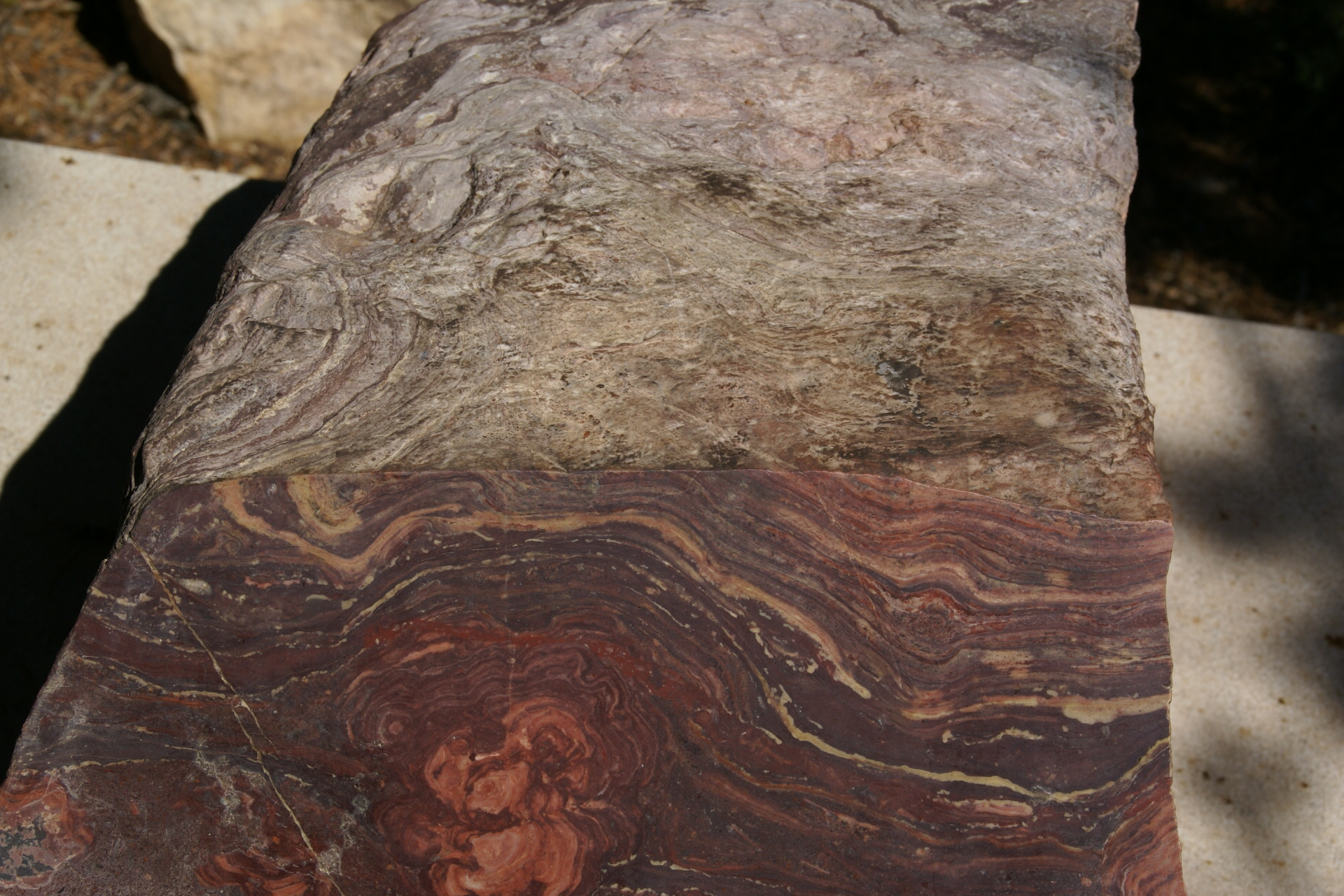
Stromatolite from the Grand Canyon Supergroup exhibit at Trail of Time

The Chuar Group of the Grand Canyon Supergroup has yielded a few Neoproterozoic fossils. Its dolomite beds contain at least six different types of stromatolites. In some of the gray and black mudrocks, paleontologists have found an abundance of organic microfossils, including vase-shaped microfossils (VSMs) likely presentative of arcellinid testate amoebae, acritarchs, "Sphaerocongregus variabilis", and organic chemicals characteristic of dinoflagellates. Finally, the enigmatic circular fossils of Chuaria circularis are found at various levels within the Chuar Group.

The Unkar Group of the Grand Canyon Supergroup also contains fossil stromatolites. stromatolites have been found in the dolomite beds of Bass Formation; in the transitional zone between the Hakatai Shale and Bass Formation; and from the he Comanche Point Member of the Dox Formation.

== Specific locales ==
Various creeks, canyons, or landforms give clues to unit locales of the Grand Canyon Supergroup members.

=== Isis Temple and "Cheops Pyramid" ===
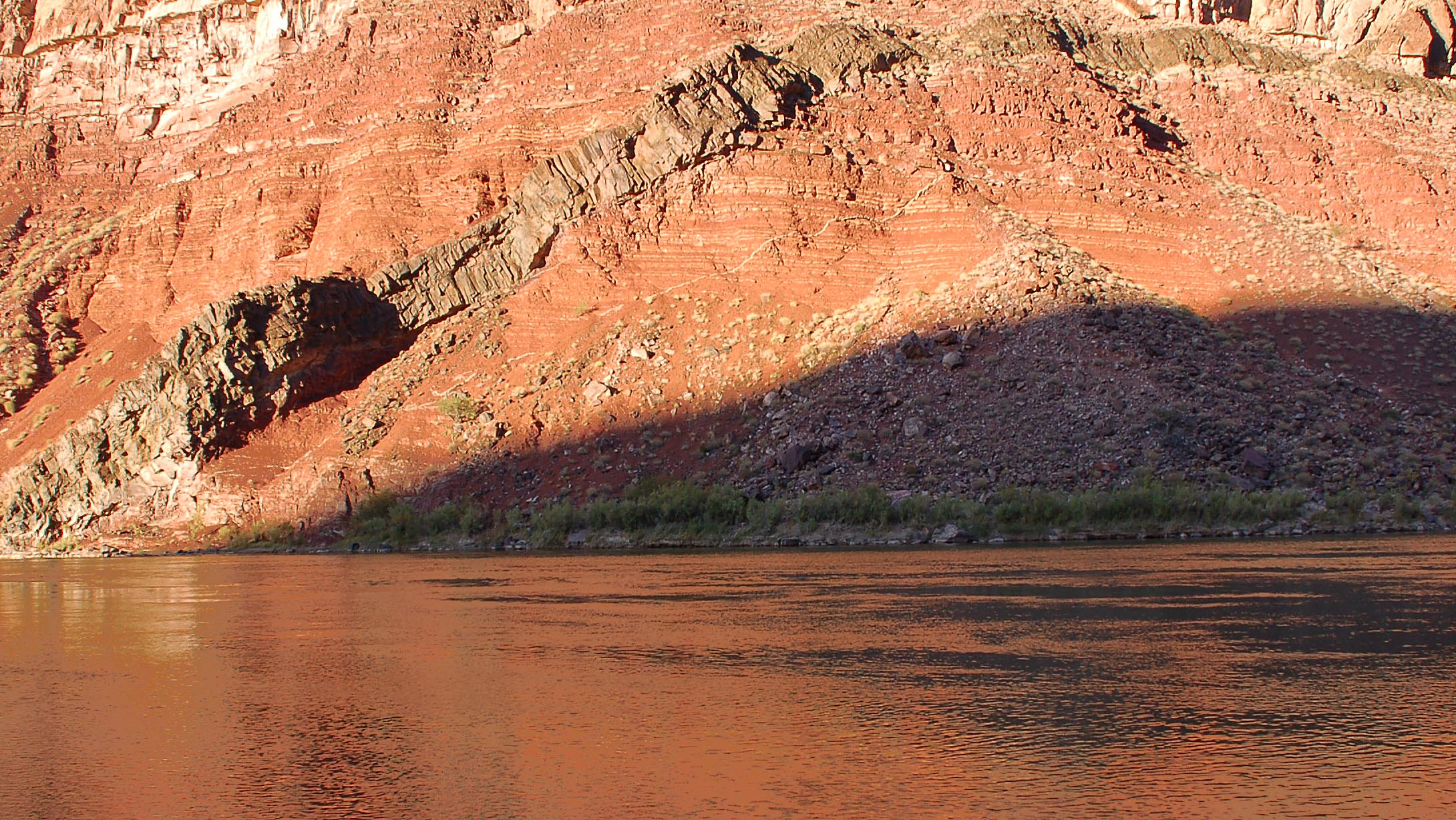
Basalt dike in orange-red Hakatai Shale along Colorado River at Hance Rapid, river mile 76.5, Grand Canyon.

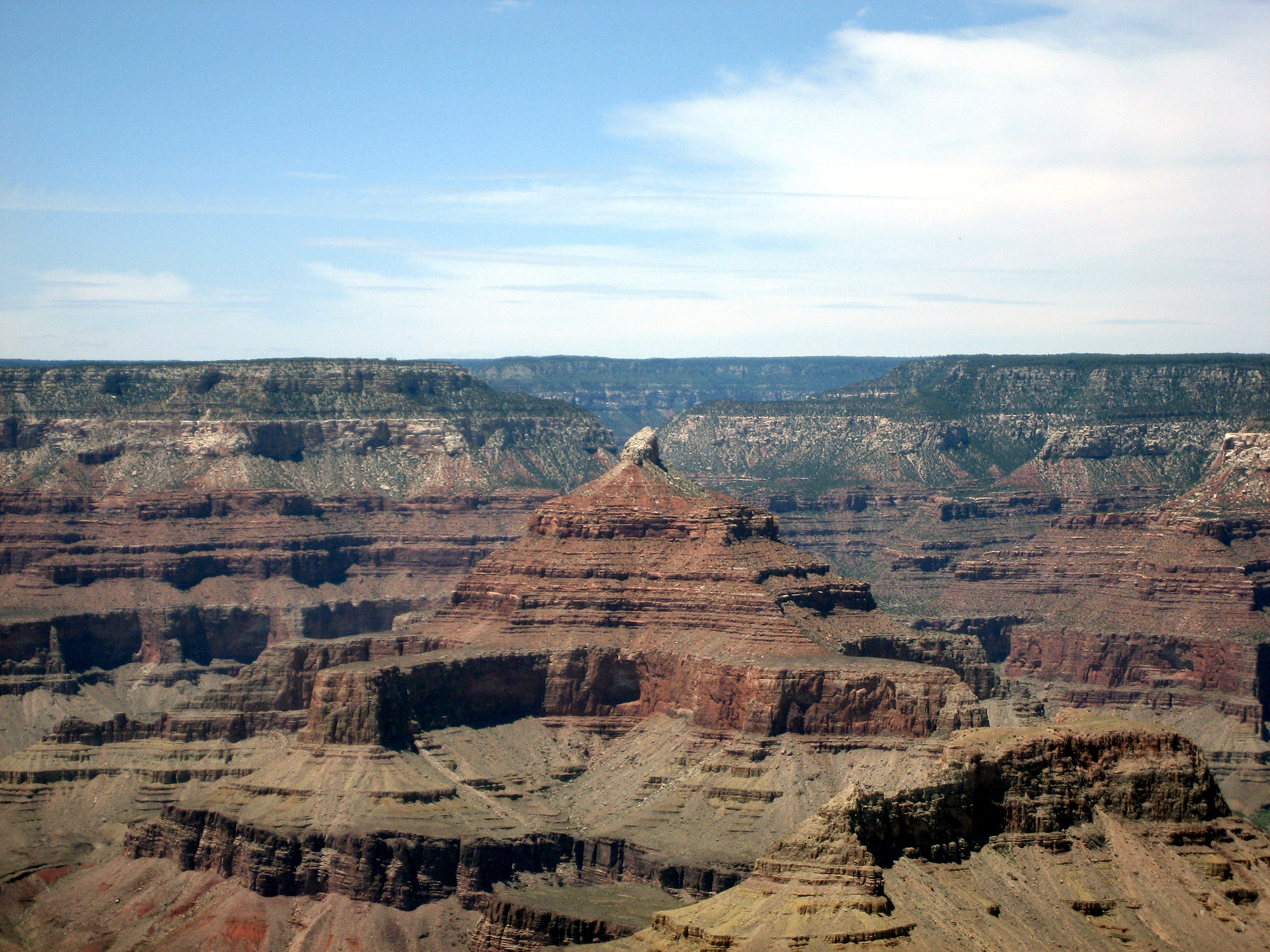
Isis Temple and Cheops Pyramid on a fault-block (horst), sitting on "island" of Shinumo Quartzite, of the Unkar Group. Bottom of the Unkar above Granite Gorge, and Vishnu Basement Rocks. (3.5 mi by 2.0 mi block)

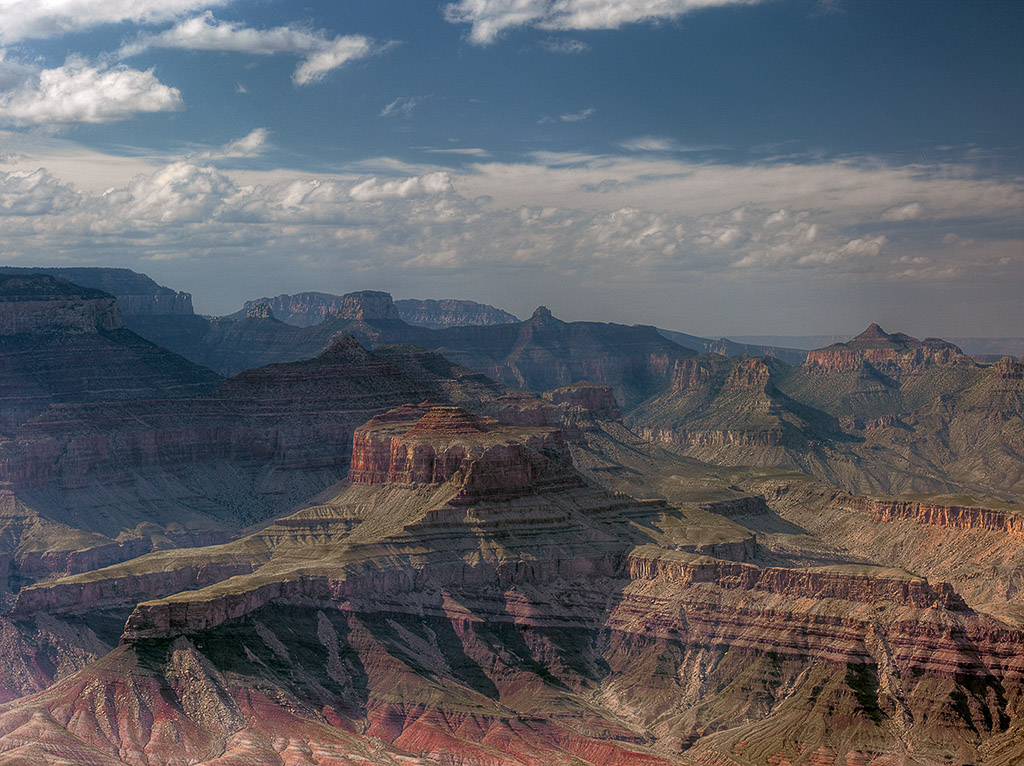
At Apollo Temple landform, the Cambrian Tapeats Sandstone lies above the angular Great Unconformity with strata of the Chuar Group, Nankoweap Formation (the striped), Cardenas Basalt (the dark), and Dox Formation (red) below. (The lower strata are dipping to the right (east), as well as a total regional-dip to the northeast.)

The Isis Temple and Cheops Pyramid formation is a part of the Shinumo Quartzite 'island' and made up of the bottom three Unkar Group members. They were overlain at the Great Unconformity, onto Tapeats Sandstone (named for the bottom unit of the marine transgression series consisting of sandstone–(conglomerates)–shale–limestone laid down by the Tapeats Sea), and are evident along the Colorado River on the Tonto Platform. The three units of the Tonto Group are Muav Limestone, upon Bright Angle Shale, upon Tapeats Sandstone. The Tapeats is a thin cliff-former unit found along Granite Gorge and its side canyons forming a flat surface in locales not dramatically affected by faulting, up-warping (domes), or down-warping.

The Isis Temple with Cheops Pyramid formation contains the bottom three members, a virtual quartzite 'mountain island' in the Tapeats Sea. (Tapeats Sandstone was deposited only around Shinumo Quartzite monadnocks.) The formation is a fault-block section located north of Granite Gorge and the intersection of Phantom Creek with the Bright Angel Canyon (which is also the intersection of the Bright Angel and Grandview–Phantom faults). The dimensions of this block are approximately 3.5 mi by 2.0 mi, with slopes of multi-colored Hakatai Shale and Bass Formation (shown as reddish, yellowish, and lavender).

=== Apollo Temple ===
The Apollo Temple formation occurs at the southeast of the Kaibab Plateau (Walhalla Plateau). The base of the largely flat-topped Redwall Limestone monolith sits upon cliffs of Muav Limestone, then Bright Angel Shale, and Tapeats Sandstone. The Nankoweap Formation is near the monolith's center of the base. The northeast side of the base merges into the overlying unit above the Nankoweap, the Chuar Group slopes.

=== Northeast Grand Canyon ===
In the northeast Grand Canyon, the Tapeats is still the defining cliff unit at the Great Unconformity between the paleozoic Tapeats Sandstone and the basement geology below. However, the entire east of the Kaibab Plateau is an uplifted side of the East Kaibab Monocline. The down-dropped east side of the Kaibab Plateau is defined by the south-flowing Colorado River.

Colorado sits below the East Rim, where the Little Colorado River enters from the east-southeast. Other sub-faults intersect it north and south of Little Colorado. Even further to the extreme northeast, at the Marble Canyon (Marble Platform), four parallel faults (2 sets of 2 – including the Eminence Fault), run parallel to the side of the Paria Plateau, striking northeasterly, resulting in the Colorado River's sharp turn to the southwest. The river then turns due-south – running down the East Kaibab Monocline.
