= Dox Formation =

Landform in the Grand Canyon, Arizona

- Stratigraphic range: Mesoproterozoic, 1,140–1,104 Ma
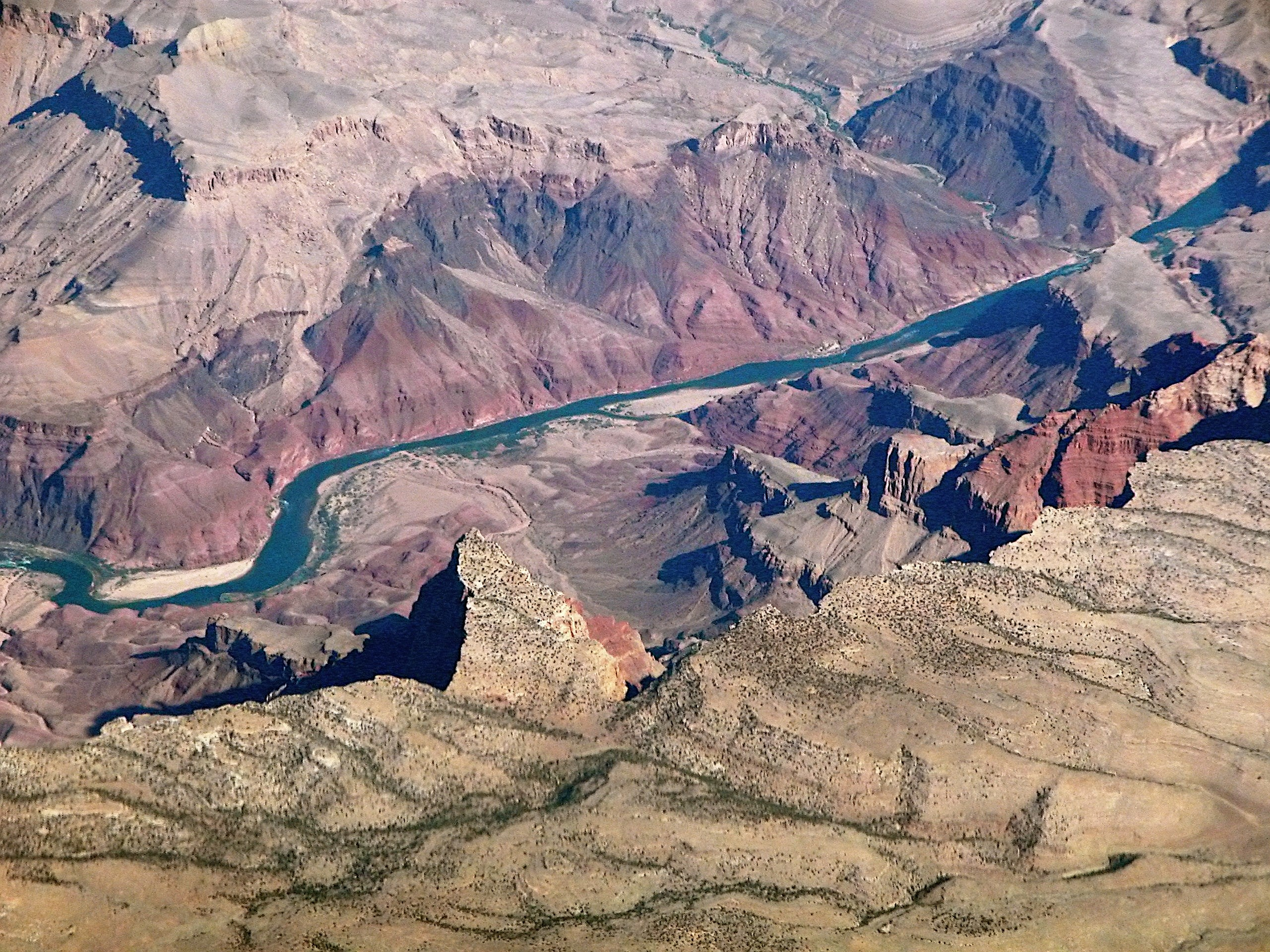
- Dox Formation at Tanner Graben-(photo left, on river) and upstream on Colorado River (from Comanche Point, East Rim)
- Type: Geological formation
- Unit of: Unkar Group
- Sub-units: Escalante Creek Member, Solomon Temple Member, Comanche Point Member, and Ochoa Point Member
- Underlies: Cardenas Basalt
- Overlies: Shinumo Quartzite
- Thickness: 350 to 410 m (1,150 to 1,350 ft)

Lithology
- Primary: sandstone
- Other: mudstone, dolomite, shale; interbedded basalt

Location
- Region: Arizona, Grand Canyon; Isis Temple region, southwest Bright Angel Canyon, at north side, Granite Gorge, and along Colorado River
- Country: United States of America

Type section
- Named for: Dox Castle, north side of Colorado River, Shinumo quadrangle, Coconino County, Arizona.
- Named by: Noble (1914)

The Dox Formation, also known as the Dox Sandstone, is a Mesoproterozoic rock formation that outcrops in the eastern Grand Canyon, Coconino County, Arizona. The Dox Formation comprises the bulk of the Unkar Group, the older subdivision of the Grand Canyon Supergroup. The Unkar Group is about 1,600 to 2,200 m (5,200 to 7,200 ft) thick and composed of, in ascending order, the Bass Formation, Hakatai Shale, Shinumo Quartzite, Dox Formation, and Cardenas Basalt. The Unkar Group is overlain in ascending order by the Nankoweap Formation, about 113 to 150 m (371 to 492 ft) thick; the Chuar Group, about 1,900 m (6,200 ft) thick; and the Sixtymile Formation, about 60 m (200 ft) thick. The entire Grand Canyon Supergroup overlies deeply eroded granites, gneisses, pegmatites, and schists that comprise Vishnu Basement Rocks.

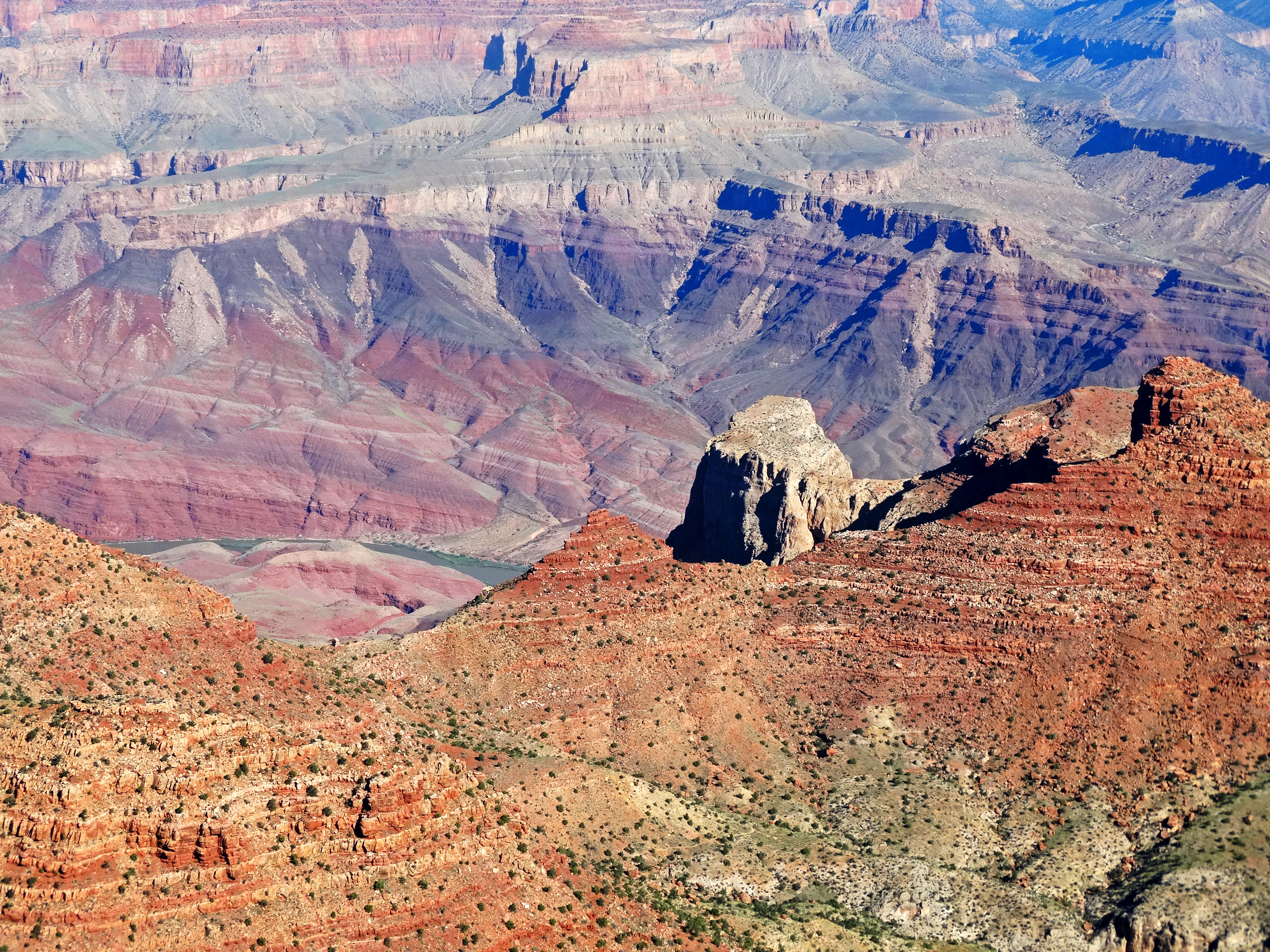
Purple colored, layered Dox Formation, below black Cardenas Basalt. (shows the ~15 degree dip)

The Dox Formation contains thick basaltic sills and a number of small, dark dikes. In the area of Desert View and west of Palisades of the Desert, the basaltic sills form very prominent, dark gray cliffs.

The Dox Formation takes its name from frontier educator Virginia Dox, the first white woman to explore the Grand Canyon, for whom the Dox Castle butte was named.

== Description ==
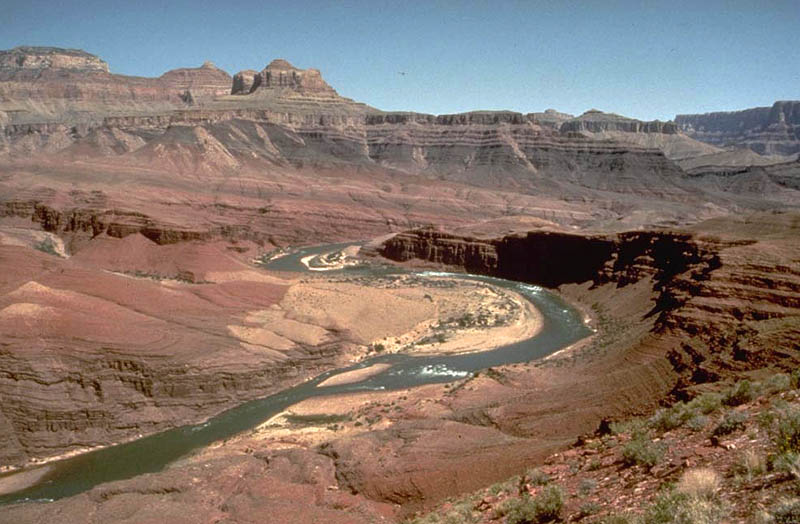
Basalt Creek cut into the Dox Formation. (At left-(northwest), entering the Colorado River at a small 'deltaic' region-(alluvial fan).)

The strata of the Dox Formation, except for some more resistant sandstone beds, are relatively susceptible to erosion and weathering. The lower member of the Dox Formation consists of silty-sandstone and sandstone, and some interbedded argillaceous beds, that form stair-stepped, cliff-slope topography. The bulk of the Dox Formation typically forms rounded and sloping hill topography that occupies an unusually broad section of the canyon.

In general, the Dox Formation and associated strata of the Unkar Group rocks dip northeast (10°–30°) toward normal faults that dip 60+° toward the southwest. This can be seen at the Palisades fault in the eastern part of the main Unkar Group outcrop area (below East Rim). Elsewhere, within the central Grand Canyon, these Unkar strata (Bass, Hakatai, and Shinumo), occur in small, rotated, downfaulted blocks or slivers where they commonly are only partially exposed. Within this part of the Grand Canyon, the Unkar Group is incomplete because pre-Tapeats Sandstone erosion has removed strata above the level of the middle part of the Dox Formation. The missing part of the Dox Formation and overlying Cardenas Basalt and Chuar Group are preserved in a prominent syncline and fault block that is exposed in the eastern Grand Canyon.

West of 75-mile Creek in the central Grand Canyon, the strata of the Dox Formation occurs in small, rotated, downfaulted blocks or slivers, and commonly are only partially exposed. In these downfaulted blocks, only the lower two members, the Escalante Creek and Solomon Temple members, are preserved as the remainder of the Dox Formation and Unkar Group has been removed by pre-Tapeats Sandstone erosion. The only complete section of the Dox Formation is exposed in the eastern Grand Canyon. In that area, the Dox formation, which is the thickest unit of the Unkar Group, has been subdivided into four members. In ascending order, they are the Escalante Creek, Solomon Temple, Comanche Point, and Ochoa Point members. The contacts between members of the Dox Formation are gradational and are based mainly on topographic expression, the sedimentary depositional environment, and color changes.

=== Escalante Creek Member ===
The lowermost member of the Dox formation is the Escalante Creek Member. It consists of over 244 m (801 ft) of light-tan to greenish brown, siliceous quartz sandstone and calcareous lithic and arkosic sandstone overlain by 122 m (400 ft) of dark-brown-to-green shale and mudstone. The sandstones of the Escalante Creek member exhibit small-scale, tabular-planar cross-bedding, and graded bedding. The graded shale beds contain interclasts at the base of this member of the Dox Formation. Two intervals of convoluted bedding, which are the stratigraphically highest occurrence of fluid evulsion structures in the Unkar Group, occur within 30 m of the base of the Escalante Creek Member. The tan to brownish color of this member contrasts sharply with the characteristic red and red-brown color of the rest of the Dox Formation.

=== Solomon Temple Member ===
Within the Dox Formation, the Solomon Temple Member overlies the Escalante Creek Member. The Solomon Temple Member consists of cyclical sequences of red mudstone, siltstone, and quartz sandstone. The lower 213 m (699 ft) of this member consist of slope-forming red-to-maroon shaley siltstone and mudstone interbedded with quartz sandstone. The upper 67 m (220 ft) of the member consists primarily of maroon quartz sandstone that exhibits numerous channel features, and contains low-angle, tabular, and channel-like festoon cross beds. The Solomon Temple Member is about 280 m (920 ft) thick in the eastern Grand Canyon. It is so named because of exposures 2.4 kilometers northeast of Solomon Temple.

=== Comanche Point Member ===
Within the Dox Formation, the Comanche Point Member overlies the Solomon Temple Member. Within the central Grand Canyon, it has been removed by pre-Tapeats Sandstone erosion. The strata of this member consist mainly of interbedded fine grained, slope-forming, argillaceous sandstone and sandy argillite, and subordinate claystone. The colors exhibited by these strata are variegated, typically alternating between purplish and red-brown. Five pale green-to-white, leached red beds that are as much as 2 m (6.6 ft) thick give a variegated appearance to this member. Salt casts, ripple marks, and desiccation cracks are common in the Comanche Point Member. It also contains a few thin beds of stromatolitic dolomite. These stromatolitic dolomite beds occur either within or directly adjacent to the leached beds. In the eastern Grand Canyon, the Comanche Point Member occupies more than half of the Dox outcrop area and is distinguished from enclosing members by its slope-forming and color variegated character.

=== Ochoa Point Member ===
The upper member of the Dox Formation is the Ochoa Point Member. Within the central Grand Canyon, it also has been removed by pre-Tapeats Sandstone erosion. It consists of micaceous mudstone that grades upward into a predominantly red quartzose, silty sandstone. Sedimentary structures found in this member include, salt crystal casts in the mudstone, and asymmetrical ripple marks and small-scale cross beds, in the sandstones. The Ochoa Point Member is 53 to 92 m (174 to 302 ft) thick and forms steep slopes and cliffs below the Cardenas Basalt. The Dox Formation that directly underlies the Cardenas Basalt consists of brick-red to vermilion well-bedded sandstone, with parallel bedding and shaly partings, forming smooth slopes. It also contains a thin, discontinuous basaltic lava flow.

At various levels within the Dox Formation, dark basalt has been injected as sills. They form very prominent, dark gray cliffs in the area below Desert View and west of Palisades of the Desert. In addition, a number of small, dark basalt dikes also have intruded into the Dox Formation.

== Contacts ==
The lower contact of the Dox Formation with the underlying Shinumo Quartzite appears to be gradational and is marked by a change in topographic expression and color. The basal 12 m (39 ft) of the Dox Formation directly overlying Shinumo Quartzite consists of predominantly dark green to black, fissile, slope-forming shale that contains thin sandstone beds. This shale makes a distinct notch between the resistant cliff-forming quartzites of the Shinumo Quartzite underlying them and resistant cliff-forming arkosic sandstones of the Dox Formation overlying them. The change in topographic expression, color, and the facies change, from quartz arenite, to mudstone and fine-grained arkose – is gradational. The contact between the Dox Formation and the Shinumo Quartzite at Mile 74.7, where the quartzite forms a narrow V-shaped gorge below a platform carved on the soft shale of the Dox Formation, can be seen from Mile 74.

The contact of the Dox Formation with the overlying Cardenas Basalt is smooth, planar, parallel to bedding, and locally interfingering. In places the sandstones of the Dox Formation have small folds and convolutions that are indicative of soft sediment deformation. In addition, in places, the uppermost 60 cm (2.0 ft) of the Dox Formation is mildly baked. A thin lava flow occurs within the uppermost part of the Dox Formation. Thus, the contact between the Cardenas Basalt and the Dox Formation is conformable and interfingering. This indicates that sands were still being deposited when the first lavas erupted and that deposition occurred during the transition from the accumulation of Dox Formation to Cardenas Basalt.

The overlying Tonto Group is separated from the Dox Sandstone and the rest of folded and faulted Unkar Group by a prominent angular unconformity, which is part of the Great Unconformity. Typically, the surface of this unconformity is a remarkably flat, ancient erosional surface, often argued to be a peneplain, that cuts across units such as the Bass Formation, Hatakai Shale, and Dox Sandstone. Resistant beds within the Unkar Group, such as Cardenas Basalt and Shinumo Quartzite, form ancient hills, called monadnocks, that rise as much as 240 m (790 ft) high above this ancient plain. Thin drapes of Tapeats Sandstone of the Tonto Group now cover most of these ancient monadnocks. However, a few of these monadnocks protrude up into the Bright Angel Shale. These monadnocks served locally as sources of coarse-grained sediments that accumulated during the marine transgression to form the Tonto Group.

Excellent exposures of the angular unconformity at the top of the Dox Formation and the base of the Tapeats Sandstone can be seen at Mile 71.0 where Tapeats Sandstone rests on the eroded surface of the Dox Formation, and a basalt sill. In these exposures, Dox red beds and a dark gray basaltic sill, dip 8 to 10 degrees to the east. They are covered by nearly horizontal Tapeats Sandstone. The surface of this angular unconformity is quite irregular as differential erosion of the resistant basalt sill formed monadnocks that have been buried by Tapeats Sandstone.

== Fossils ==
Stromatolites are the dominant fossils reported from the Comanche Point Member of the Dox Formation. These stromatolites, which weather brown to greenish-brown, consist of dolomite, with minor amounts of silt and clay. They typically take the form of laterally linked hemispheroids and are associated with desiccation cracks and birdseye structures. In addition, a few thin dolomite beds having fine laminations, possibly algal, occur beneath the lower marker bed in the Comanche Point Member.

== Depositional environments ==
The Dox Formation is a complex sequence of marine, coastal, estuarine, and fluvial mud-dominated deposits that represent deposition at the prograding margin of the Unkar Basin. The Escalante Creek and Solomon Temple members preserve the record of fluvial, estuarine, and deltaic sedimentation. The contact between the underlying Shinumo Quartzite and the Dox formation represents a change from the accumulation of sediments in nearshore marine and coastal environments, to the accumulation of sediments in terrestrial floodplains and river channels. The Escalante Creek Member consists of sediments that were deposited in shallow river channels, which were as wide as 150 feet (46 m) and 15 feet (4.6 m) deep. Numerous stacked sandstone channels can be observed just above Unkar Rapid (River Mile 73) and within side drainages between River Miles 65 and 73. At the base of the Escalante Creek Member, the two intervals of convoluted bedding, which comprise the stratigraphically highest fluid evulsion structures in the Unkar Group, appear to represent the last of the series of earthshocks that began during deposition of the Shinumo Quartzite.

Strata containing large sandstone channels of the Escalante Creek Member are overlain by strata containing much smaller channels, such as those of braided streams in a delta, and sheet flow environments, of the Solomon Temple Member. At Mile 64 in Carbon Creek, this part of the Dox Formation consists of stacked, fine-grained sandstone channels that are cut by mud-filled, younger channels. These “cut-and-fill” channel structures are regarded to be indicative of estuarine environments where sea level has fallen and subsequently risen. The contact between the Solomon Temple and Comanche Point members of the Dox Formation marks a transition from fluvial and coastal environments to marine conditions.

The deposition of the Comanche Point Member of the Dox Sandstone marked a return to marginal-marine and tidal flat conditions. Interbedded purplish and red-brown strata of this member appear to reflect accumulation under alternately very shallow water marine and subaerial conditions. The purplish colored beds are interpreted as deposits of tidal flat complexes including mixed-flat and possibly salt-flat environments.

The Ochoa Point Member is interpreted to have accumulated as the result of continued tidal-flat sedimentation. The lower part of this member appears to have accumulated in the higher mud flat position of the tidal flat environment where periodic desiccation occurred. The upper part of this member is inferred to have accumulated in the deeper, or more seaward part of the tidal-flat environment. At the time that these tidal flats were covered by the initial eruption of the Cardenas Basalt, the eastern grand Canyon region was at or very near sea level. Features found in the lowermost part of the Cardenas Basalt indicate that the basaltic lavas outpoured over unconsolidated sandy and silty Dox sediments at the time they were wet. It is unknown whether these sediments were slightly above or slightly below water level at the time they were buried by lava. The high proportion of altered glass in and the pervasive fracturing (hyaloclastite) of the basal Cardenas Basalt support this interpretation. The high sodium content of the basal Cardenas Basalt indicates spilitization due to reaction with hypersaline water. Hematitic alteration of the sediment that resulted from baking by the lavas is minimal, amounting to a few centimeters or less.

== Age ==
Indirect dating of mica grains from the Dox Formation indicate that it was deposited over a relatively short time span, between 1140 and 1104 Ma. Individual mica grains from the Escalante Creek Member of the Dox, were collected and dated by 40Ar/39Ar mass spectrometry. This dating of mica grains yielded a distribution of ages ranging from ca. 1260–1120 Ma, with a well-defined peak at 1140 Ma. Although it was suspected that these dates recorded the age at which the mineral cooled through a critical temperature window of ~300 °C, the dating of additional samples from other members, and petrographic and microprobe examination of the mica, indicated the ages of source rocks from which the micas were eroded, and support the interpretation that the Dox Formation is younger than 1140 Ma. Additional dating of detrital zircons from the Dox Formation, corroborated the dating of mica grains, and showed that much of the Unkar Group (excluding the Bass Formation) was deposited between 1170 and 1100 Ma, and that the Dox formation was deposited after 1140 Ma. The age of the overlying Cardenas Basalt demonstrates that the Dox Formation accumulated before 1104 Ma.

== See also ==
- Geology of the Grand Canyon area
- Great Unconformity
- Tanner Graben
