= Nankoweap Formation =

Neoproterozoic geologic sequence of the Grand Canyon Supergroup

- Stratigraphic range: Neoproterozoic, <770 Ma
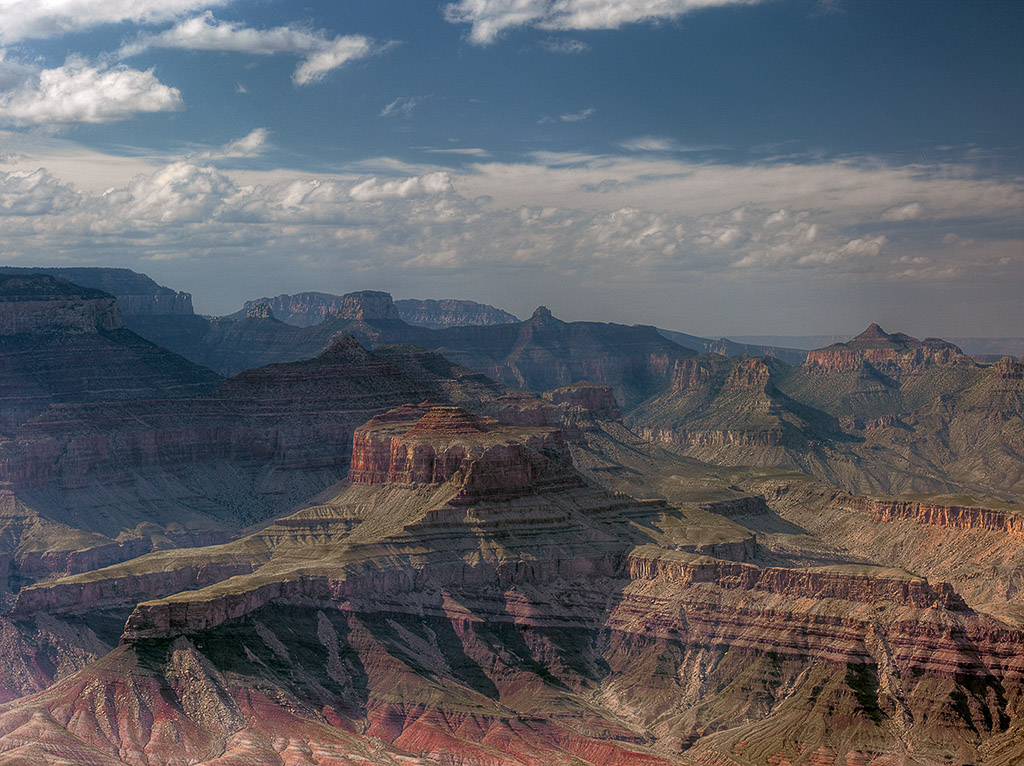
- Venus Temple landform, NNW of Lipan Point (East Rim); tilted (striped & multilayered) Nankoweap Formation above tilted (blackish) Cardenas Basalt, above (tilted and reddish) Dox Formation.
- Type: Geological formation
- Unit of: Grand Canyon Supergroup
- Underlies: Chuar Group and, as part of the Great Unconformity, the Tapeats Sandstone
- Overlies: Cardenas Basalt
- Thickness: 370 ft (110 m) approximate maximum

Lithology
- Primary: sandstone, siltstone & shale (red beds)

Location
- Region: Arizona east Grand Canyon Lava Butte region on Colorado River, near Lipan Point
- Country: United States (Southwestern United States)
- Extent: (eastern) Grand Canyon, Colorado River region

Type section
- Named for: Nankoweap Canyon
- Named by: Van Gundy (1934), Van Gundy (1951), and Maxson (1961)

The Neoproterozoic Nankoweap Formation (pronounced Nan' coe weep), is a thin sequence of distinctive red beds that consist of reddish brown and tan sandstones and subordinate siltstones and mudrocks that unconformably overlie basaltic lava flows of the Cardenas Basalt of the Unkar Group and underlie the sedimentary strata of the Galeros Formation of the Chuar Group. The Nankoweap Formation is slightly more than 370 ft (110 m) in thickness. It is informally subdivided into informal lower and upper members that are separated and enclosed by unconformities. Its lower (ferruginous) member is about 40 ft (12 m) thick. The Grand Canyon Supergroup, of which the Nankoweap Formation is part, unconformably overlies deeply eroded granites, gneisses, pegmatites, and schists that comprise Vishnu Basement Rocks.

The strata of the Nankoweap Formation are exposed in a small area that occupies an area from just south of Carbon Canyon to Basalt Canyon on the west bank of the Colorado River around Comanche Creek and Tanner Canyon on the east bank of the Colorado River within the eastern Grand Canyon, Coconino County, Arizona. It and associated strata of the Unkar and Chuar Groups are preserved in a prominent syncline and fault block. The most complete, readily accessible, and easily studied, exposure of the Nankoweap Formation occurs in Basalt Canyon.

The nomenclature of the Nankoweap Formation has changed over time. Originally, the strata of the Nankoweap Formation was included in-part in the top of the Unkar terrane (Group) and in-part in the basal Chuar terrane (Group) by Walcott in 1894. Van Gundy first recognized the thin sequence of red beds unconformably overlying basaltic flows of the Unkar Group as a separate stratigraphic unit, which he called the Nankoweap Group.

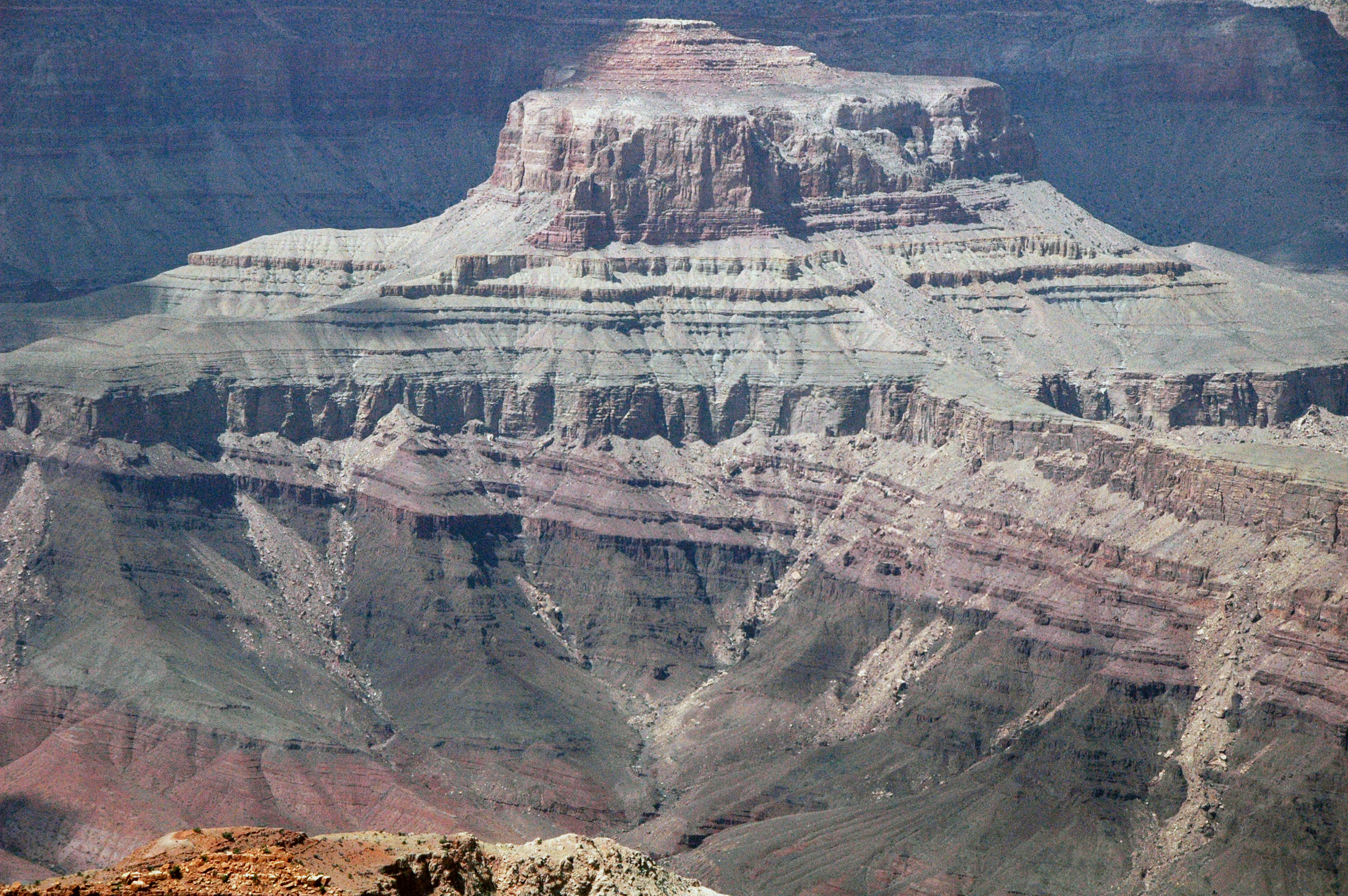
Close-up of Apollo Temple

Although more extensive outcrops exist in Basalt Canyon, Comanche Creek, and Tanner Canyon, it is named for a small, fault-bounded block of the Nankoweap Formation in Nankoweap Canyon. It was argued that these redbeds belonged neither to the underlying Unkar Group nor overlying Chuar Group. Maxson in his geological mapping reduced the Nankoweap Group to formational rank because the Nankoweap had not been subdivided into formations. Later, a locally preserved lower member (ferruginous unit and weathered zone) that unconformably overlies the Cardenas Basalt and is unconformably overlain by the upper member of the Nankoweap – was recognized.

== Description ==
The Nankoweap Formation is about 370 ft (110 m) thick. Currently, it is divided into two informal members, the lower (ferruginous) member and the upper member. These members are separated and enclosed by unconformities.

The lower (ferruginous) member of the Nankoweap Formation consists of thin, 40 ft (12 m) or less thick, erosional remnants that overlie deeply eroded and often deeply weathered basaltic lava flows of the Cardenas Basalt. Within the Grand Canyon, the lower member of the Nankoweap Formation outcrops at only two locations adjacent to the trace of the north-south-trending Butte Fault. First, it outcrops just north of the Colorado River in the eastern side of the Basalt graben at Tanner Canyon Rapids. At Tanner Canyon Rapids, the lower member consists of red, highly resistant, hematite-cemented, quartzitic sandstones and siltstones that have a maximum thickness of about 40 ft (12 m) and disappears within about 650 ft (200 m) west of the Butte Fault between the upper member of the Nankoweap Formation and the eroded surface of the Cardenas Basalt. Finally, it outcrops 1.2 mi (1.9 km) due south of the Colorado River near and at the southern limit of preservation of the Cardenas Basalt and Nankoweap Formation. At this location, it consists of a thin layer of highly ferruginous sandstone that is composed of sediments derived from the underlying Cardenas Basalt. It lies upon a 33 ft (10 m) thick ferruginous weathered zone (paleosol) developed in the eroded surface of the Cardenas Basalt.

The upper member of the Nankoweap Formation consists of about 330 ft (100 m) of generally reddish-purple, fine-grained, quartzitic sandstones. They are shaley and silty towards the top. The sandstones sometime contain conglomeritic horizons composed of rounded, disc-shaped pebbles of Dox Sandstone and occasional pebbles of basalt lava. A lag deposit of gravel composed of white to yellowish, small pebble to cobble size chert gravel occurs locally at the base of the upper member. Typically, the sandstone sections are thin-to-medium bedded and exhibit planar tabular and trough cross-bedding, ripple marks, mudcracks, numerous soft-sediment deformation structures, and rare salt pseudomorphs. Towards the top of the upper member, massive, meter-scale sandstone beds become common.

== Nature of contacts ==
Unconformities mark both the base and, possibly, the top of the Nankoweap Formation. The red beds of the Nankoweap Formation unconformably overlie the Cardenas Lavas of the Unkar Group. At most places, the upper member of the Nankoweap Formation directly overlies the Cardenas Basalt. In Basalt Canyon, an angular discordance in this lower contact reflects the erosion of 200 ft (61 m) of Cardenas Basalt has been recognized. West of Tanner Canyon, erosion has locally removed as much as 1,000 ft (300 m) of Cardenas Basalt before the deposition of the Nankoweap Formation. As demonstrated by a 33 ft (10 m) thick ferruginous weathered zone (paleosol), deep chemical weathering of the exposed lava flows of the Cardenas Basalt occurred before deposition of the Nankoweap Formation west of Tanner Canyon. The deeply weathered lavas retain their original textures but have been pervasively stained and altered to earthy hematite and siderite.

The upper contact of the Nankoweap Formation with the base of the Galeros Formation of the Chuar Group appears to be quite sharp. The upper part of the Nankoweap Formation consists of cliff-forming sandstones that grade irregularly upward – from red to white. This change in color has been interpreted to reflect bleaching beneath an unconformity that separates red beds of the Nankoweap Formation from dark-gray dolomites of the Galeros Formation. Because this contact lies in the middle of sheer cliffs formed by the combined sandstones of the Nankoweap Formation and the overlying dolomites of the Galeros Formation, it is not easily accessible, and little is known about it. The inaccessibility of the upper contact of the Nankoweap Formation has prevented a close examination of it. Except for wide shallow channels cut in the Nankoweap Formation and filled with dolomite, the upper contact lacks any stratigraphic evidence that indicates a large erosional or temporal hiatus. The contact between the overlying Tapeats Sandstone and the folded and faulted Nankoweap Formation is a prominent angular unconformity that is part of the Great Unconformity. Uranium-lead dating of detrital zircons from the Nankoweap Formation indicate the presence of zircon grains in approximately the 800–770 Ma age range. This finding indicates that the Nankoweap Formation is closely related in age and stratigraphy to the Chuar Group – and any unconformity associated with its upper contact is relatively minor in duration and significance. Thus, the Nankoweap Formation is most likely the basal unit of the Chuar Group.

== Depositional environments ==
The depositional environments of the Nankoweap Formation remain unclear and poorly defined. The deeply weathered paleosol developed in the Cardenas Basalt represents an extended period of subaerial weathering prior to the deposition of the Nankoweap Formation. The sandstones of its lower member are also quite weathered and, thus, appear to have accumulated subaerially. The sedimentary structures in the upper member of the Nankoweap Formation are interpreted to indicate that it accumulated beneath moderate- to low-energy, shallow waters, either in a shallow sea or lake. Strata within the upper part of the Nankoweap Formation is inferred to have accumulated in sand and mudflats. Also, cross-bedded sandstone layers within the upper member of the Nankoweap Formation are argued to be beach deposits.

== Fossils ==
Van Gundy identified a structure found in a sandstone bed of the Nankoweap Formation in Basalt Canyon as a trace fossil impression of a stranded jellyfish. This structure is about 4.7 in (12 cm) in diameter and consists of a series of radiating lobes, rounded at their ends. Some of these lobes have a median groove radiating from a small, irregular hollow. Initially, later studies also considered this to be a jellyfish impression, and it was eventually named “Brooksella canyonensis” by Bassler. Later, Cloud obtained a partial second specimen and argued that both specimens were of inorganic origin and formed by "compaction of fine sands deposited over a compressible but otherwise unidentifiable structure, possibly a small gas blister." Paleontologists, who were unconvinced by Cloud's interpretation, reinterpreted this structure to be a burrow (trace fossil), known as “Asterosoma,“ made by a sediment feeding, worm-like organism. Other paleontologists, who later reexamined both specimens, argued that they are inorganic, sedimentary structures similar to small "sand-volcanoes" formed by the upward expulsion of gas or fluid from sediments as more sediment is loaded on top or as the sediment is shaken during seismic activity. Both specimens are very similar in morphology to sedimentary structures initially interpreted to be fossil jellyfish and named “Astropolithon.” Like Brooksella canyonensis, Astropolithon is now regarded to be the result of the venting of fluidized sand into surficial sediments blanketed by microbial mats that were typical of Precambrian sea- and lake-bottoms. Very similar sedimentary structures have been observed in a thick tsunami deposit related to the asteroid impact at the Cretaceous–Paleogene boundary

== Age (basal Chuar Group theory) ==
The Nankoweap Formation has not been directly dated using radiometric dating techniques. It is younger than the age of the Cardenas Basalt, which erupted about 1,104 million years ago. The Nankoweap Formation was presumed to be older than the 800 to 740 Ma strata that comprises the overlying Chuar Group. However, uranium-lead dating of detrital zircons from the Nankoweap Formation found it contains detrital zircons that are approximately 800–770 Ma in age. This finding indicates that the Nankoweap Formation is younger than 770 Ma; it is closely related in age to the Chuar Group – and quite likely is the basal member of this group.

== Barite deposits ==
Within Nankoweap Canyon, prospect pits have been dug into numerous patches of sandstone that have been replaced by hematite. In these prospect pits, barite cemented sandstone, and thin barite veins, have been found. A few of these patches exceed 10 ft (3.0 m) in width. The sandstones containing these patches are highly deformed and cut by numerous small faults.

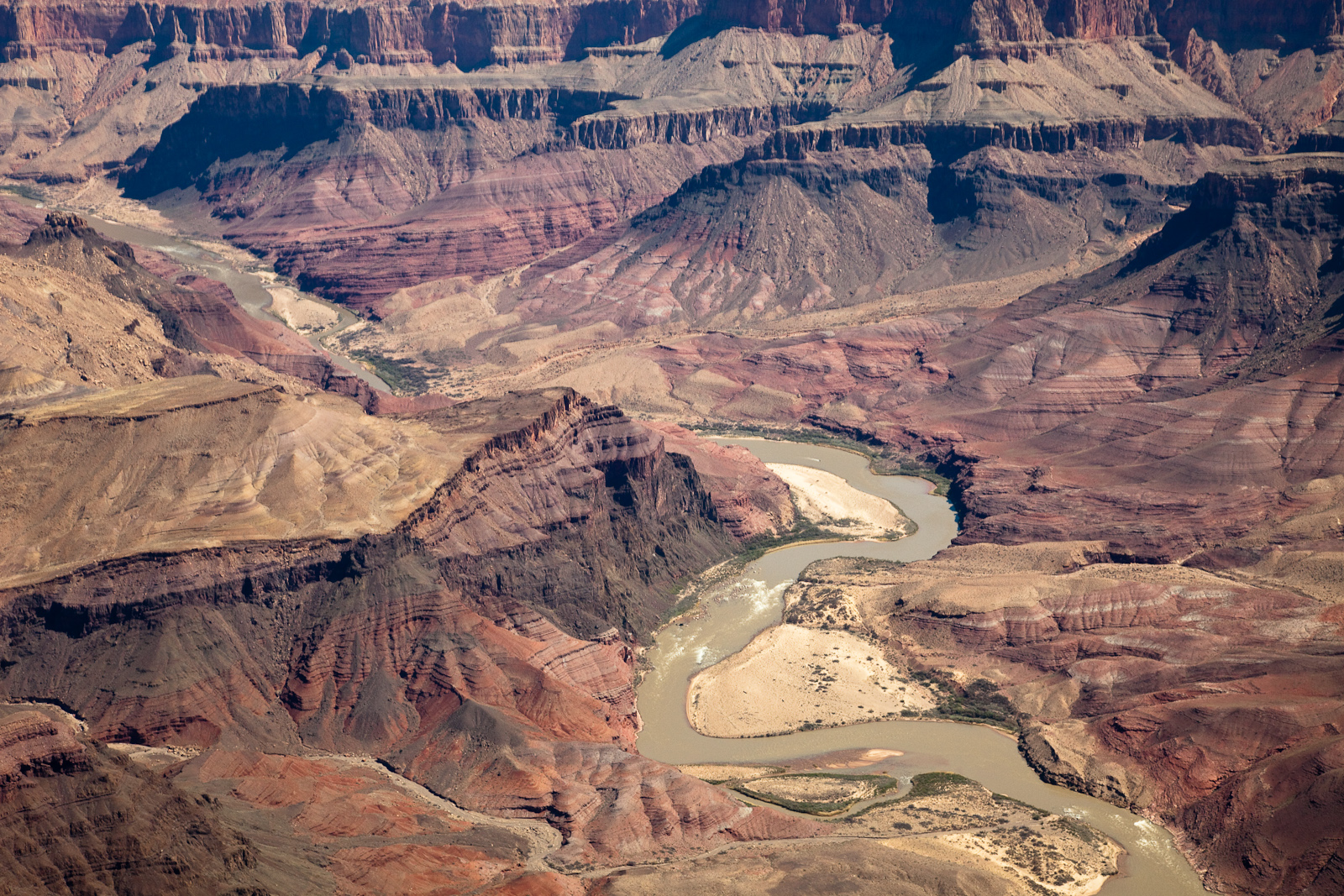
Nankoweap Formation above dark black Tanner Graben (riverside above Tanner Rapid)

== Nankoweap Creek and Tanner Graben ==
Nankoweap Creek is located upstream from the Lipan Point–Basalt Creek section. The creek is west of Marble Canyon, and enters the canyon near Lower Marble Canyon.

The Tanner Graben, a down-dropped graben of Dox Formation and Cardenas Basalt is topped by a bright, multilayered section of the Nankoweap Formation. It lies opposite Tanner Creek-(Tanner Canyon) which is the source for the Tanner Rapid, at the foot of Tanner Graben.

== See also ==
- Tanner Graben
- Geology of the Grand Canyon area
- Stratigraphy
- Great Unconformity
