= Sheba Temple =

Landform in the Grand Canyon, Arizona

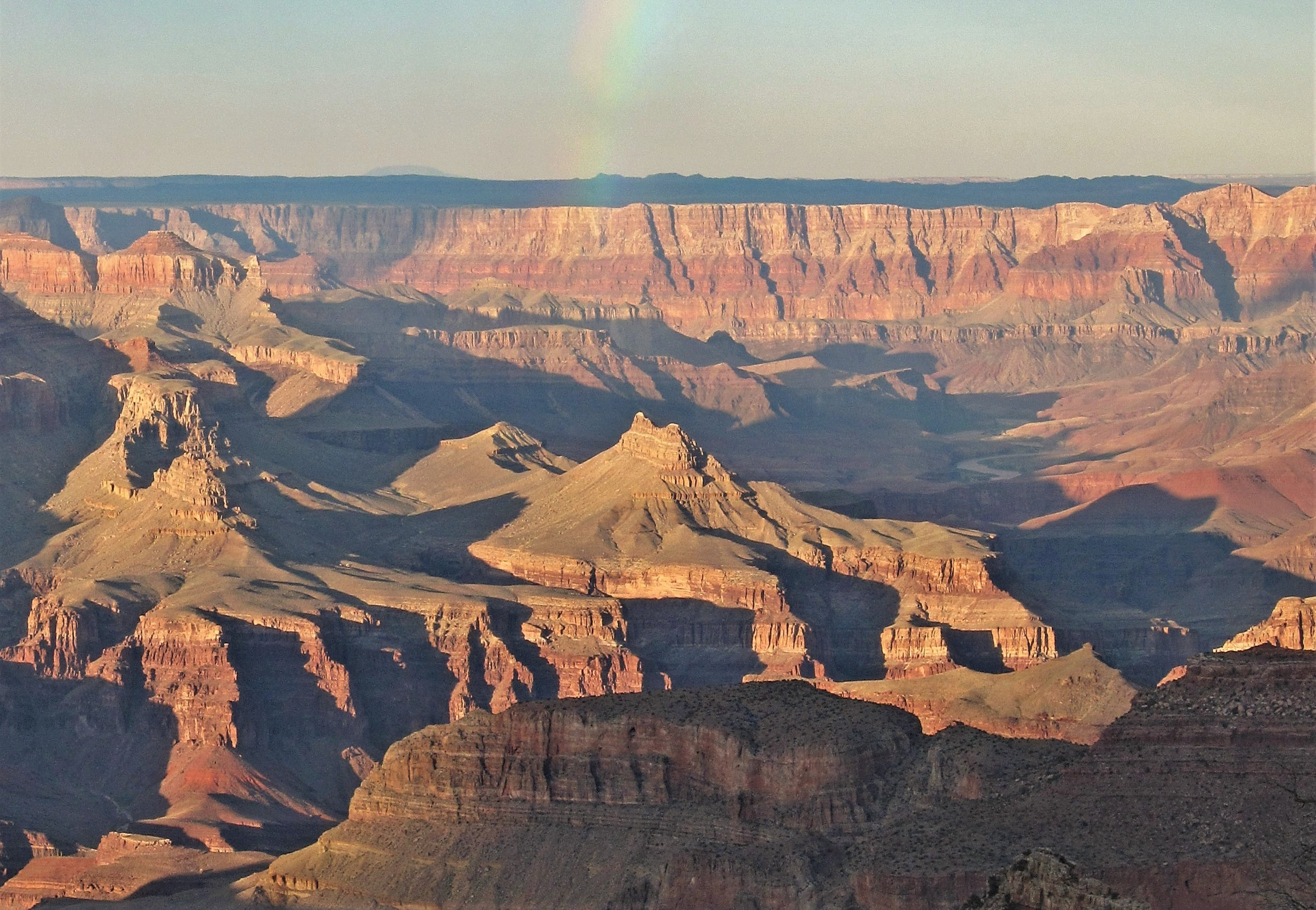
- Sheba Temple – (left, (ridgeline, below cliff)); Solomon Temple – (right)

Highest point
- Elevation: 4,990 ft (1,520 m)
- Prominence: 410 ft (120 m)
- Parent peak: Rama Shrine
- Isolation: 0.86 mi (1.38 km)
- Coordinates: 36.0605402°N 111.9301623°W

Geography
- Location within Arizona Location within the United States
- Location: Grand Canyon National Park; Coconino County, Arizona, US
- Parent range: Kaibab Plateau (Walhalla Plateau); Colorado Plateau
- Topo map: USGS Cape Royal

Geology
- Rock age: Mississippian down to Cambrian
- Mountain type(s): sedimentary rock: sandstone, shale, quartzite
- Rock type(s): Redwall Limestone-(extreme cliff-erosion-remnants); Muav Limestone, Tonto Group-(3-units); 3_Muav Limestone, 2_Bright Angel Shale, 1_Tapeats Sandstone, Unkar Group units (3 of 5); 3_Shinumo Quartzite, 2_Hakatai Shale

Sheba Temple is a 4,990-foot (1,520 m)-elevation summit located in the eastern Grand Canyon, in Coconino County of northern Arizona, United States. The landform is 1.0 mile (1.6 km) west of Solomon Temple, 1.0 mile south of Rama Shrine (adjacent a south-projecting ridgeline), and about one mile north-northeast of the west-flowing Colorado River. The west of Sheba Temple's drainage is the short Asbestos Canyon which drains Krishna Shrine, northwest, Vishnu Temple (Grand Canyon), northwesterly, and Rama Shrine, north; the east side of Sheba Temple's drainage are short north drainages to the Colorado.

Sheba Temple is composed of extreme cliff-erosion-remnants of Redwall Limestone, (very vertical and very narrow, ~north-south aligned), upon a platform of Muav Limestone; as unit three of the 3-member Cambrian Tonto Group, the Muav is also upon wide slope-former slopes of the dull-greenish Bright Angel Shale. Sheba Temple is a narrow ridgeline trending slightly north-northeast-by-south-southwest and has been geologically detached from the Redwall cliff extending south from Rama Shrine. Of note, the remnant, white prominence, is the same elevation as Solomon Temple east, Solomon's is an actual small platform of a white cliff-former. Sheba Temple's prominence is only a remainder of that cliff-former (Redwall interlayer).
