= Newberry (disambiguation) =

Newberry is a surname.

The Newbery Medal is a literary award for children's books.

The Newberry Library is a private research library in Chicago.

Newberry may also refer to some places in the United States:

- Newberry, Florida
  - Newberry High School (Florida)
- Newberry, Indiana
- Newberry, Michigan
- Newberry, South Carolina
  - Newberry College
- Newberry Township, Pennsylvania
- Newberry County, South Carolina
- Newberry National Volcanic Monument
- Newberry Crater

== See also ==
- Newbery (disambiguation)
- Newbury (disambiguation)
