= Newberry =

Newberry is a surname, a variant of Newbury. Notable people with the surname include:

- AJ Newberry (born 2005), American football player
- Booker Newberry III (1956–2023), American singer and keyboardist
- Brennan Newberry (born, 1990), American professional stock car racing driver
- Brian Newberry (born 1971), American politician and member of the Rhode Island House of Representatives
- Christian Newberry (born 1968), British competitive figure skater
- Clare Turlay Newberry (1903–1970), American author and illustrator of children's books
- Claude Newberry (1888–1916), South African cricketer
- Dan Newberry, American politician and member of the Oklahoma Senate
- Fannie Ellsworth Newberry (1848–1942), American writer of girls' stories
- George Newberry (1917–1978), British track cyclist
- Graham Newberry (born 1998), British figure skater
- Guillermo Newberry (1898–?), Argentine sprinter
- Hazel Newberry, British dancer
- Jake Newberry (born 1994), American baseball player
- Janet Newberry (born 1953), American tennis player
- Jared Newberry (born 1981), American footballer
- Jeremy Newberry (born 1976), American footballer
- Jessica Newberry-Ransehousen (born 1938), American equestrian
- Jim Newberry, Mayor of Lexington, Kentucky
- Jimmy Newberry, Negro league baseball player
- John Newberry (ice hockey) (born 1962), Canadian ice hockey player
- John Josiah Newberry (1877–1954), founder of store chain J. J. Newberry
- John Stoughton Newberry (1826–1887), American politician
- John Strong Newberry (1822–1892), American geologist, physician and explorer
- Luke Newberry (born 1990), English actor
- Michael Newberry (artist), American painter
- Michael Newberry (footballer) (1997–2024), English footballer
- Morgan Newberry (born 1999), British para-cyclist
- Percy Newberry (1869–1949), British Egyptologist
- Sterling Newberry (1915–2017), American inventor and microscopist
- Thomas Newberry (1811–1901), English Bible scholar
- Tom Newberry (born 1962), American footballer
- Tommy Newberry, American author and success coach
- Truman Handy Newberry (1864–1945), American businessman and politician
- Walter C. Newberry (1835–1912), American politician
- Walter Loomis Newberry (1804–1868), American businessman and philanthropist

== See also ==
- Newbery
- Newbury (disambiguation)
- Newbury (surname)
