= Newbery (disambiguation) =

Newbery is a surname.

Newbery may also refer to:

- Newbery Medal, a literary award
  - Newbery Honor, a runner-up to this award

== See also ==
- Newberry
- Newbury (disambiguation)
