= Newbery =

Newbery is a surname.

== People ==
- Chantelle Newbery (born 1977), Australian Olympic diver
- David Newbery (born 1943), British economist
- Eduardo Newbery (1878–1908), Argentine odontologist and aerostat pilot
- Francis Newbery (disambiguation), several people
- James Newbery (1843–1895), Australian industrial chemist
- John Newbery (1713–1767), British book publisher
- Jorge Newbery (1875–1914), Argentine aviator
- Linda Newbery (born 1952), British author
- Robert Newbery (born 1979), Australian Olympic diver

== See also ==
- Newberry
- Newbury (surname)
- Newbery Medal, an award for American children's literature named after John Newbery
