= HMS Newbury =

Three ships of the Royal Navy have borne the name HMS Newbury:

- English ship Newbury (1654), renamed Revenge after the restoration in 1660
- HMS Newbury (1916) was a Racecourse-class minesweeper
- SS Newbury (1927) was a merchant marine ship

== See also ==
- Newbury (disambiguation)
