= Rama Shrine =

Landform in the Grand Canyon, Arizona

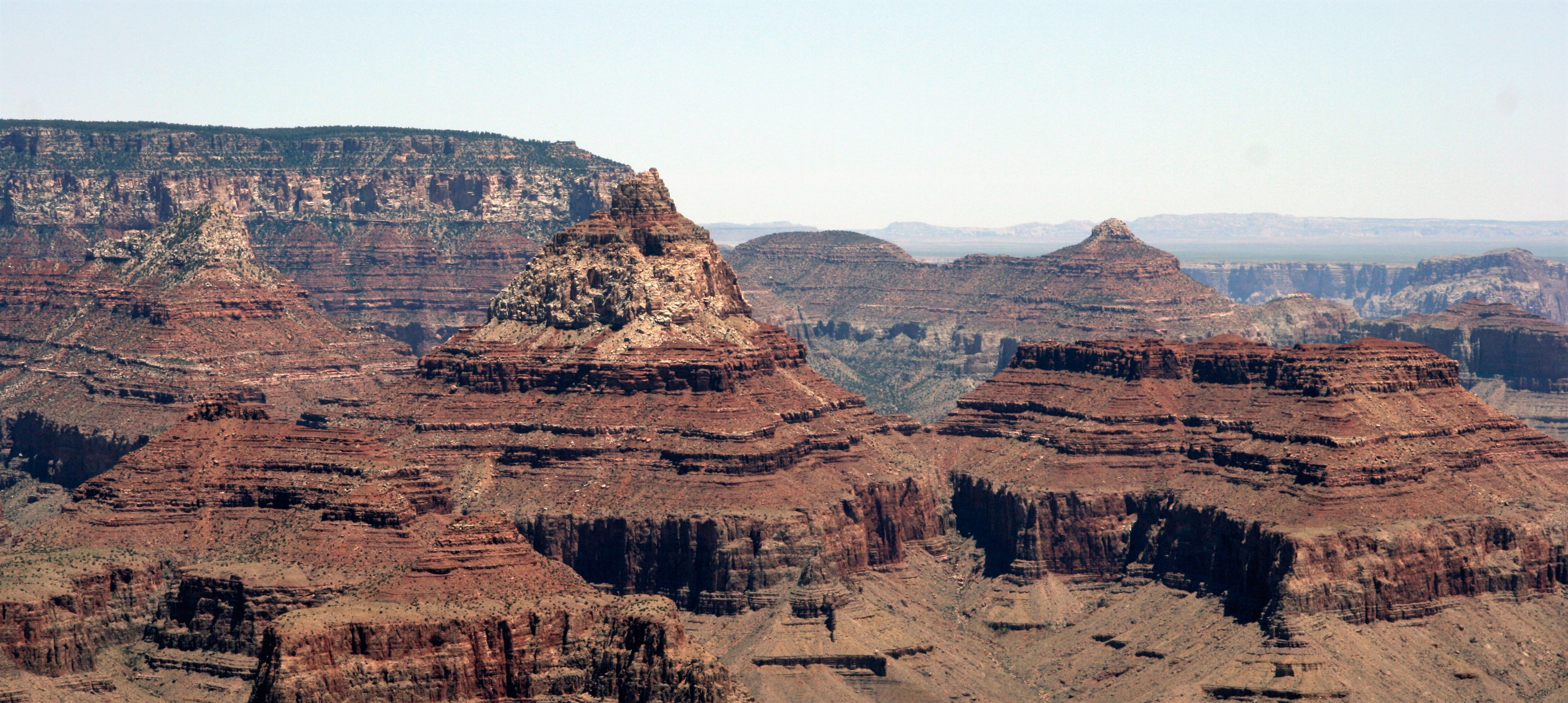
- Krishna, Vishnu, & Rama prominences (Freya Castle at left rear)

Highest point
- Elevation: 6,406 ft (1,953 m)
- Prominence: 706 ft (215 m)
- Parent peak: Vishnu Temple
- Isolation: 0.98 mi (1.58 km)
- Coordinates: 36.078318°N 111.9237735°W

Geography
- Location within Arizona Location within the United States
- Location: Grand Canyon National Park; Coconino County, Arizona, US
- Parent range: Kaibab Plateau (Walhalla Plateau); Colorado Plateau
- Topo map: USGS Cape Royal

Geology
- Rock age(s): Permian down to Mesoproterozoic-(east flank, northwest of Colorado River)
- Mountain type(s): sedimentary rock: shale, sandstone, siltstone, mudstone, limestone, shale, basalt, silty-sandstone, sandstone
- Rock type(s): Hermit Shale-(prominence-debris); Supai Group-(unit 4, platform-Esplanade Sandstone), Supai Group, Redwall Limestone, Tonto Group-(3 units), 3_Muav Limestone, 2_Bright Angel Shale, 1_Tapeats Sandstone, Grand Canyon Supergroup-(4 units), 1-Unkar Group-(5-units), (unit 5)-Cardenas Basalt, (unit 4)-Dox Formation

Rama Shrine is a 6,406-foot (1,953 m)-elevation platform-summit located in the eastern Grand Canyon, in Coconino County of northern Arizona, United States. The Shrine is named for Rama, the Hindu god of chivalry and virtue. The landform is attached at the southeast to the Vishnu Temple massif, about 1.0 mile (1.6 km) distant. Rama Shrine is about 3.0 miles (4.8 km) southeast of the Cape Royal overlook, Walhalla Plateau (southeast Kaibab Plateau, North Rim). A twin landform occupies the southwest of Vishnu Temple, the Krishna Shrine. Rama Shrine towers about 4,000 feet (1,200 m) above the Colorado River, about 2.0 miles (3.2 km) southeast. Drainages to the Colorado are east and southeast; between the two Shrines, is the south Asbestos Canyon drainage.

The Rama Shrine prominence is a rectangular platform of the Supai Group (unit 4 of 4), the cliff-former (and platform-former), hard Esplanade Sandstone. Remainder debris of very-shallow slopes of burnt-red Hermit Shale (a slope-former) cover the horizontal platform.

== Geology ==
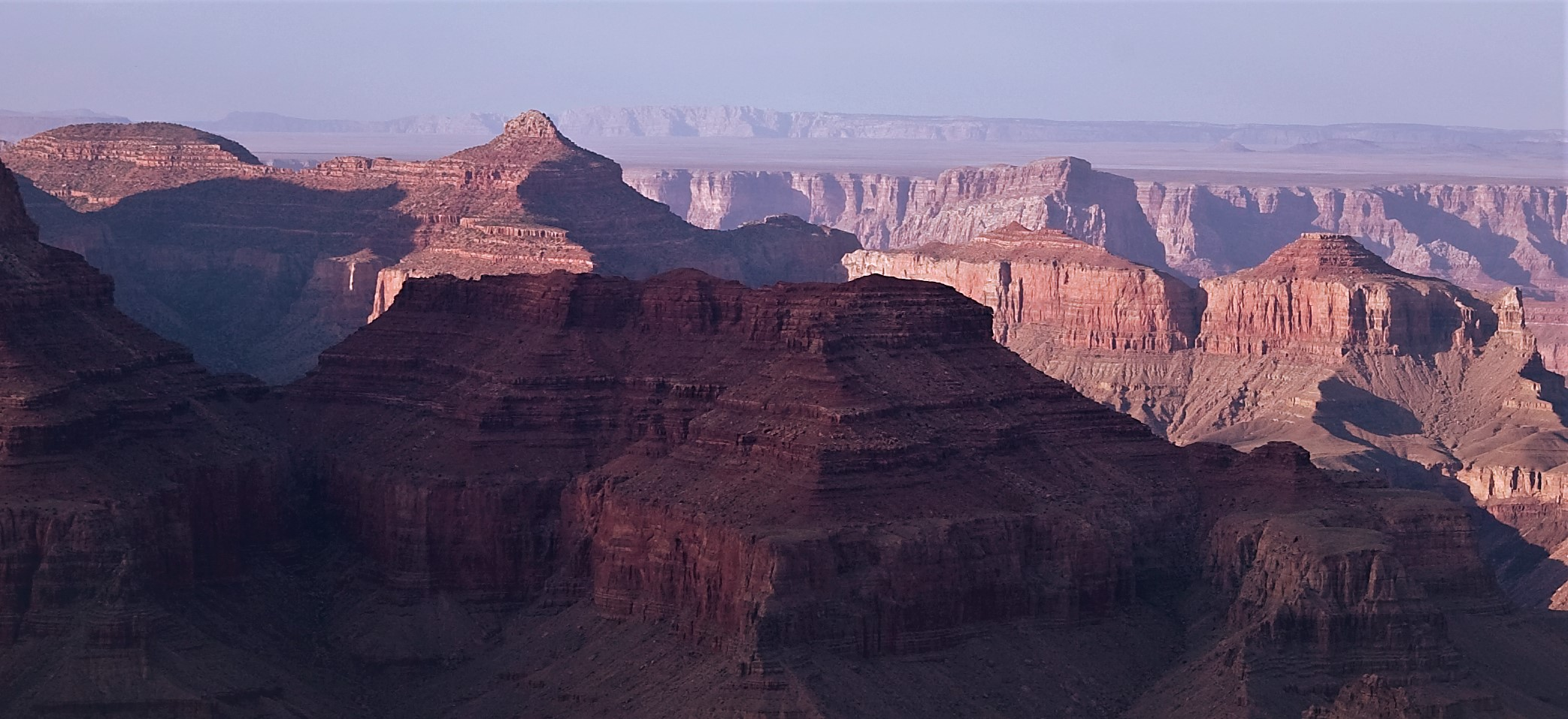

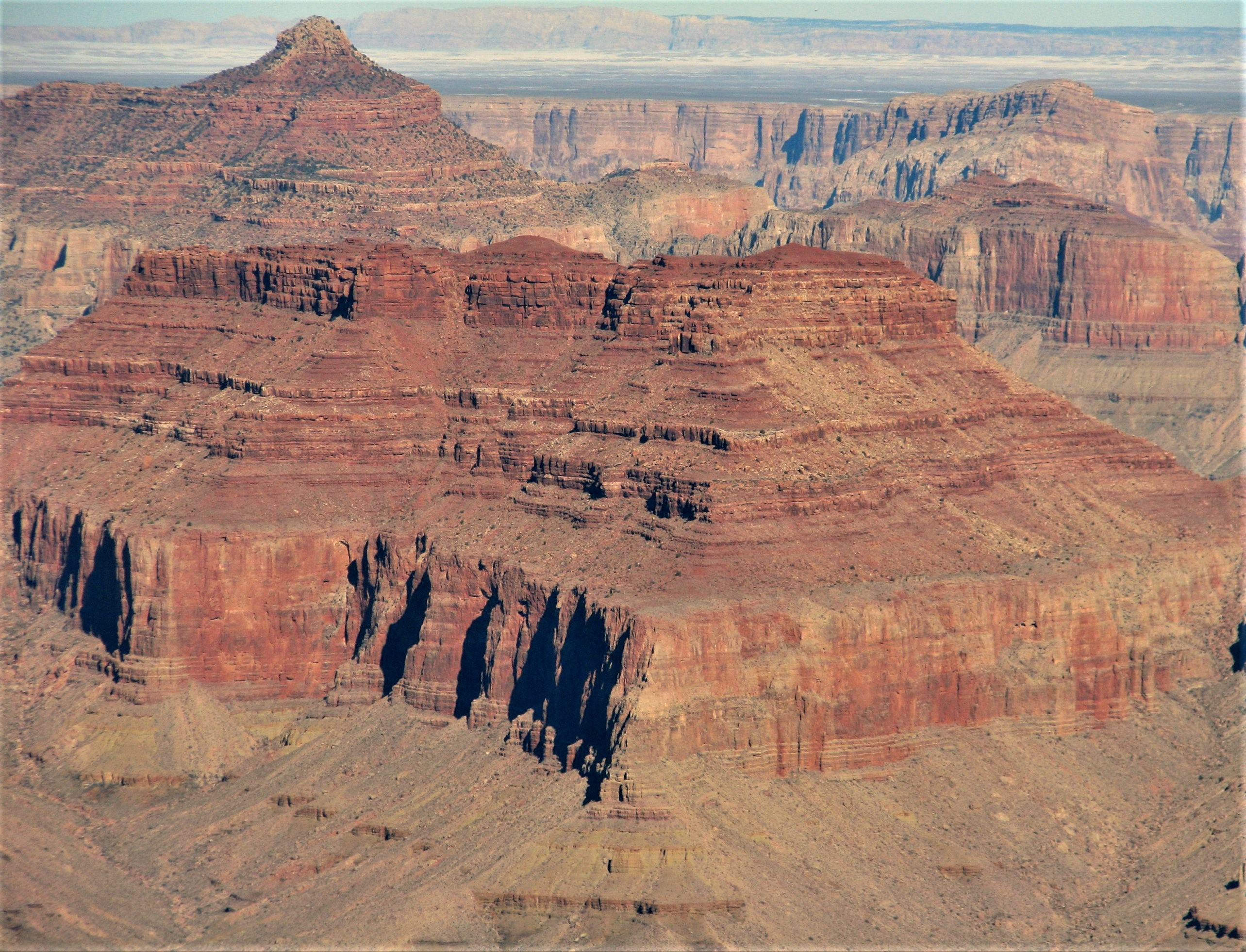
Rama Shrine with Jupiter Temple left, and Venus Temple right

The geology of Rama Shrine is basically identical to its Vishnu Temple neighbor; on Vishnu Temple, the slopes of dark burnt-red Hermit Shale (a slope-former), are large and visible. The debris-remainder on the Rama Shrine platform is of similar color, and is composed of Hermit Shale debris-remainder, upon hard Esplanade Sandstone (unit 4, Supai), and the debris is dark-burnt-red, and discontinuous in its depth.

Beneath the Supai Group, is the platform and cliff of Redwall Limestone, and below, the three Cambrian units.

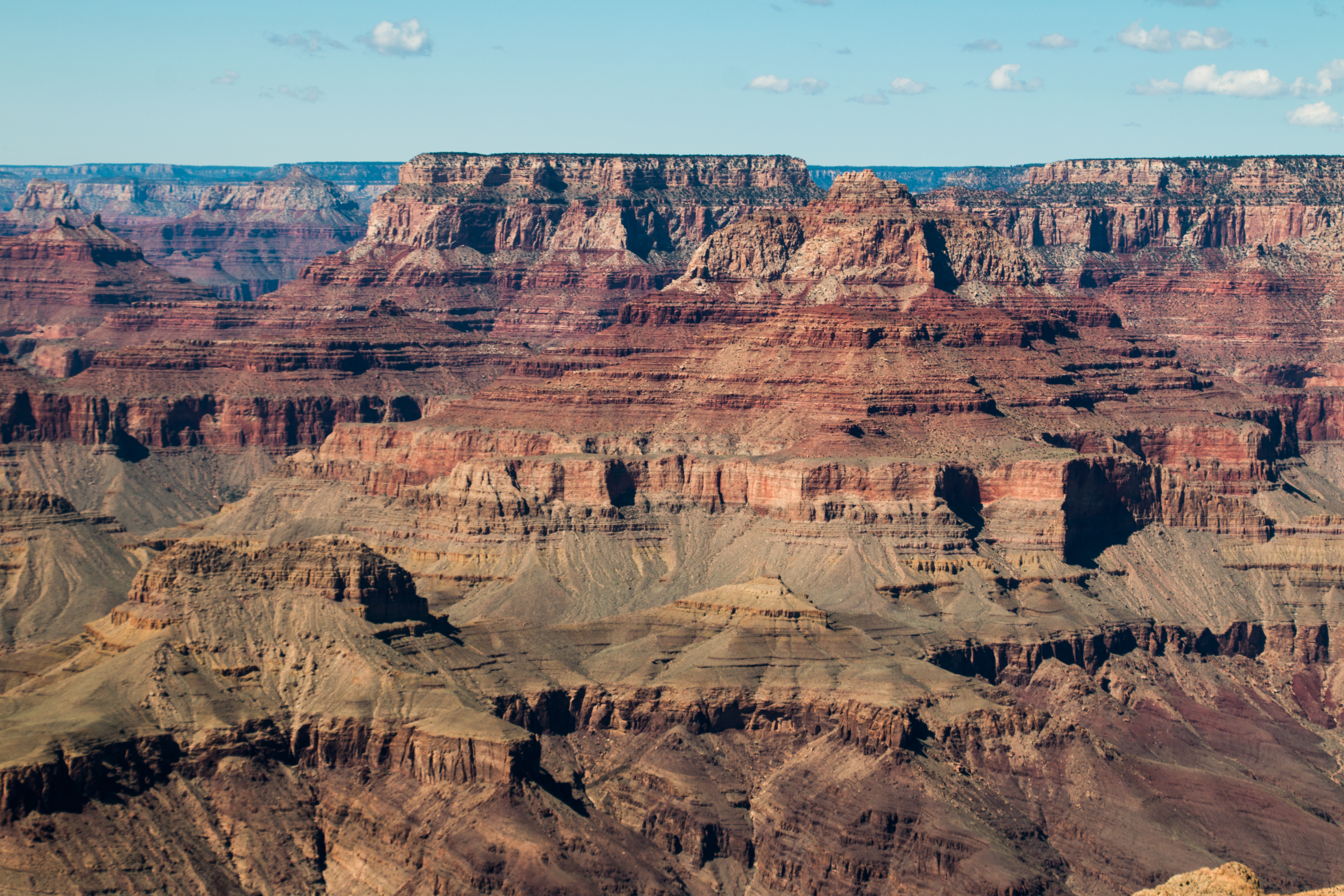
northwest aspect (from South Rim), Wotans Throne, Vishnu Temple, Rama Shrine, on tilted Mesoproterozoic Dox Formation

When Rama Shrine is viewed from the southeast, (from the South Rim), it overlooks the northwest side of the Colorado River, and a wide expanse of hills and valleys of the colorful Dox Formation, (Mesoproterozoic). The southeast flank of Rama Shrine can be seen down to the Tapeats Sandstone, (the Great Unconformity). (The 1,000 million-year time erosion, and the ancient rock layers below.)

== See also ==
- Krishna Shrine
- Sheba Temple
- Solomon Temple
