= Solomon Temple (Grand Canyon) =

Landform in the Grand Canyon, Arizona

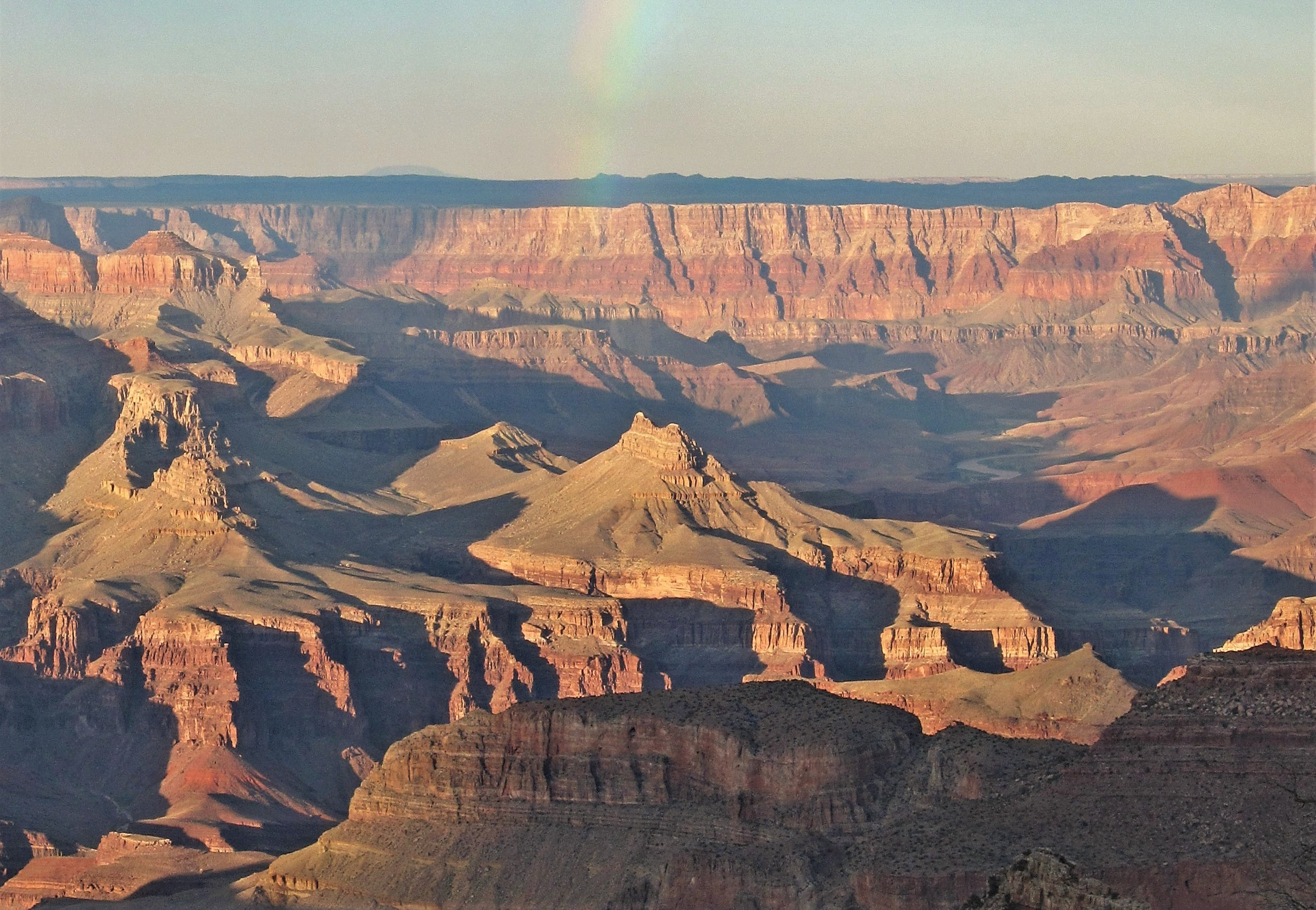
- Solomon Temple centered in bullseye. Southwest aspect, from Grandview Point.

Highest point
- Elevation: 5,121 ft (1,561 m)
- Prominence: 661 ft (201 m)
- Parent peak: Rama Shrine (6,406 ft)
- Isolation: 1.41 mi (2.27 km)
- Coordinates: 36°03′26″N 111°54′56″W

Geography
- Location within Arizona Location within the United States
- Country: United States
- State: Arizona
- County: Coconino
- Protected area: Grand Canyon National Park
- Parent range: Kaibab Plateau; Colorado Plateau
- Topo map: USGS Cape Royal

Geology
- Rock type(s): limestone, sandstone, shale

Solomon Temple is a 5,121-foot-elevation (1,561-meter) summit located in the Grand Canyon, in Coconino County of northern Arizona, USA. It is situated four miles north of Moran Point, 3.5 miles east of Newberry Butte, and 1.5 mile southeast of Rama Shrine, its nearest higher neighbor. Topographic relief is significant as it rises 2,500 feet (760 meters) above the Colorado River in less than one mile.

Solomon Temple was named after historical king Solomon by geologist François E. Matthes, following Clarence Dutton's practice of naming geographical features in the Grand Canyon after mythological deities and heroic figures. This feature's name was officially adopted in 1906 by the U.S. Board on Geographic Names.

Solomon Temple is a butte composed of Mississippian Redwall Limestone, which overlays shale of the Cambrian Tonto Group. The Solomon Temple Member of the Dox Formation is so named because of exposures 2.4 kilometers northeast of this butte.

According to the Köppen climate classification system, Solomon Temple is located in a Cold semi-arid climate zone.

== See also ==
- Geology of the Grand Canyon area

== Gallery ==
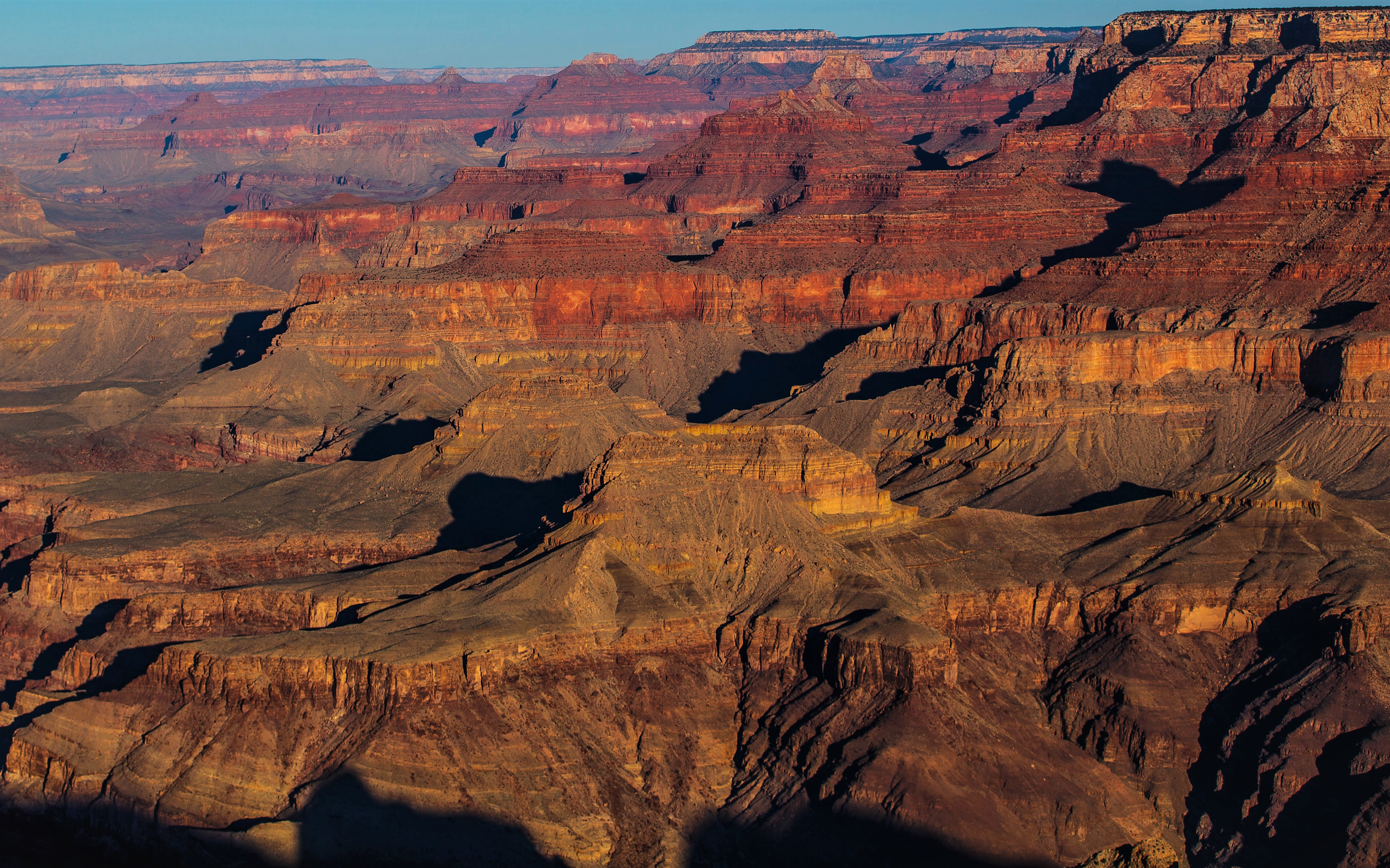
Solomon Temple centered in lower half of frame. East aspect from Desert View.

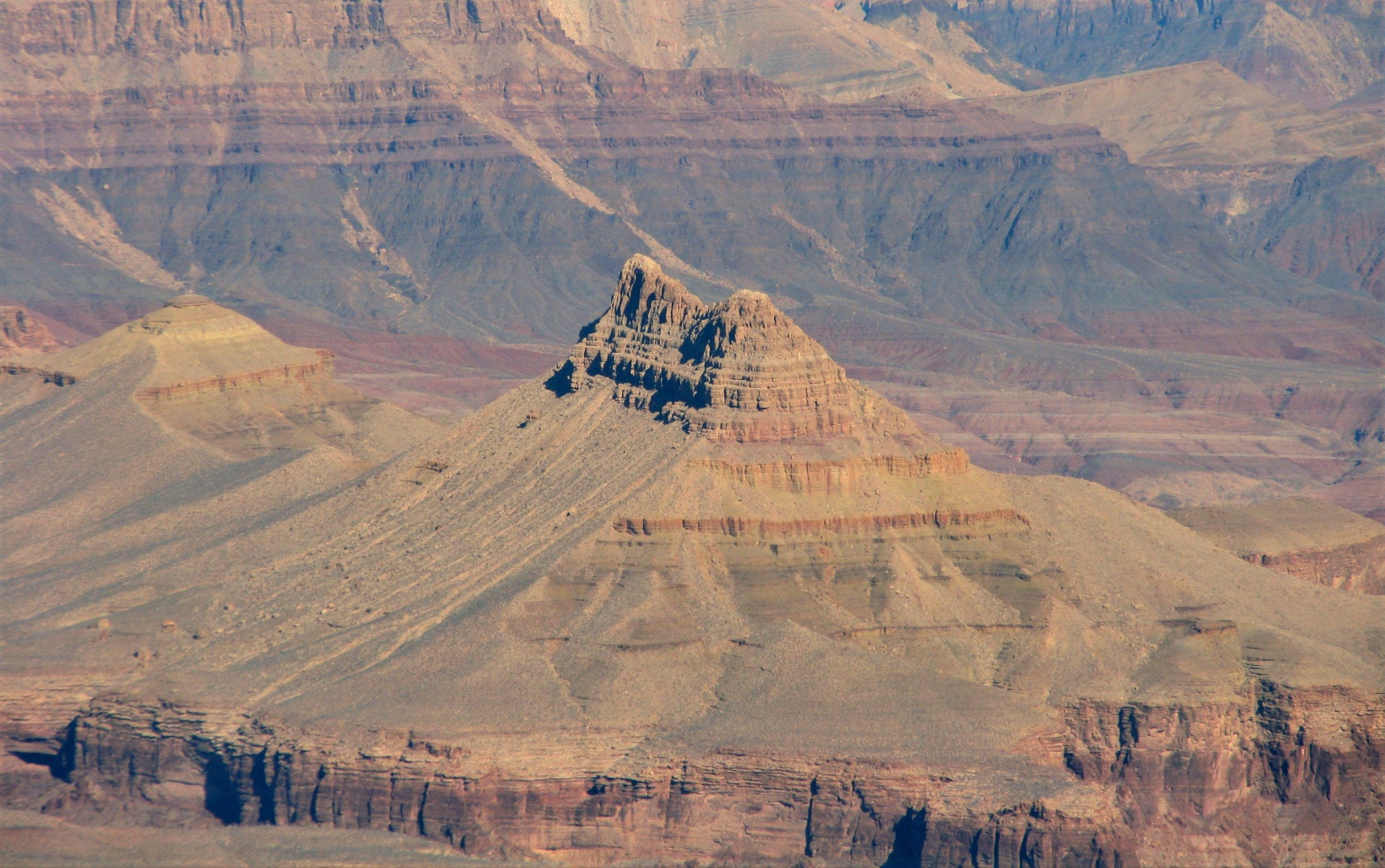

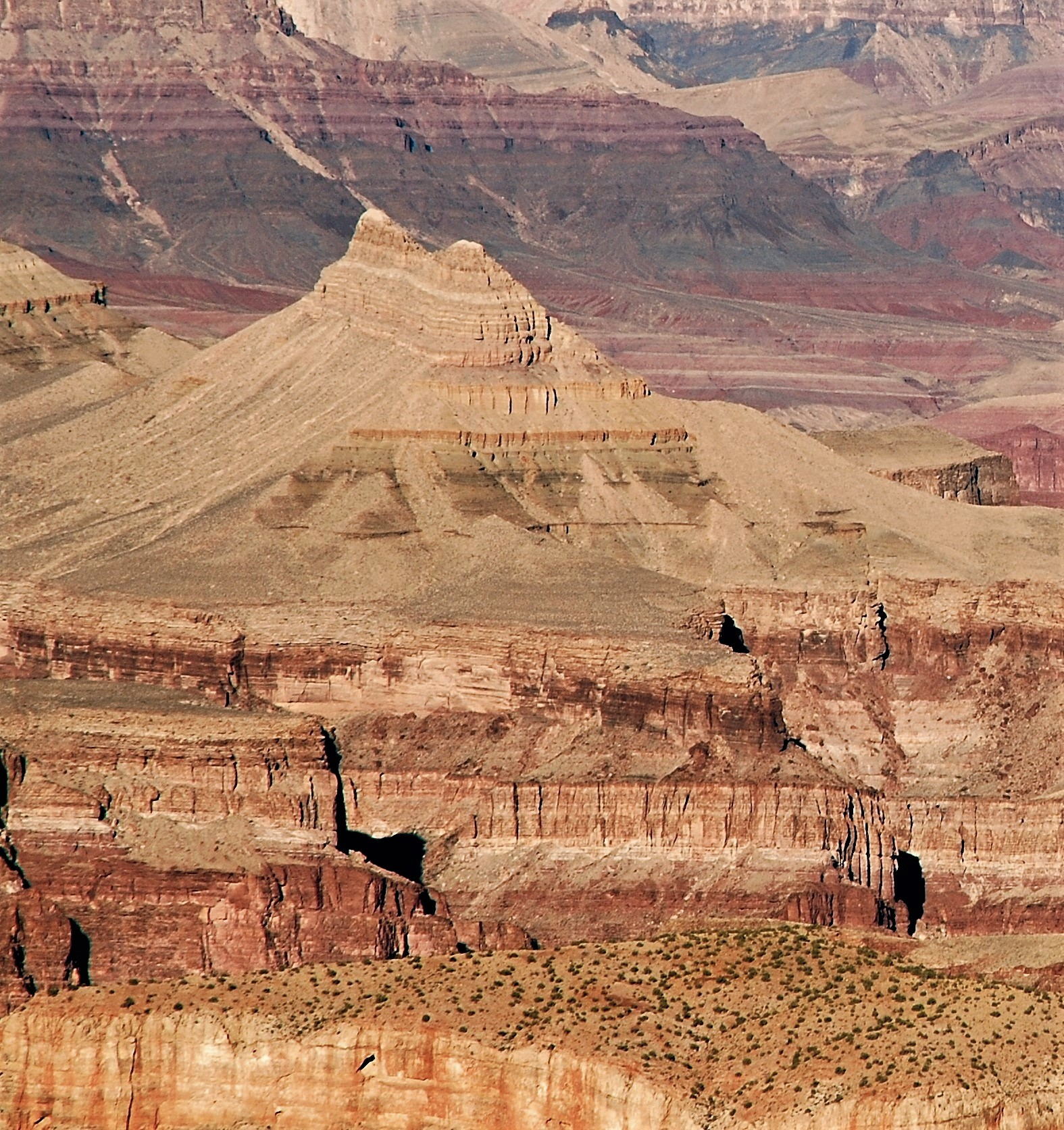
Solomon Temple

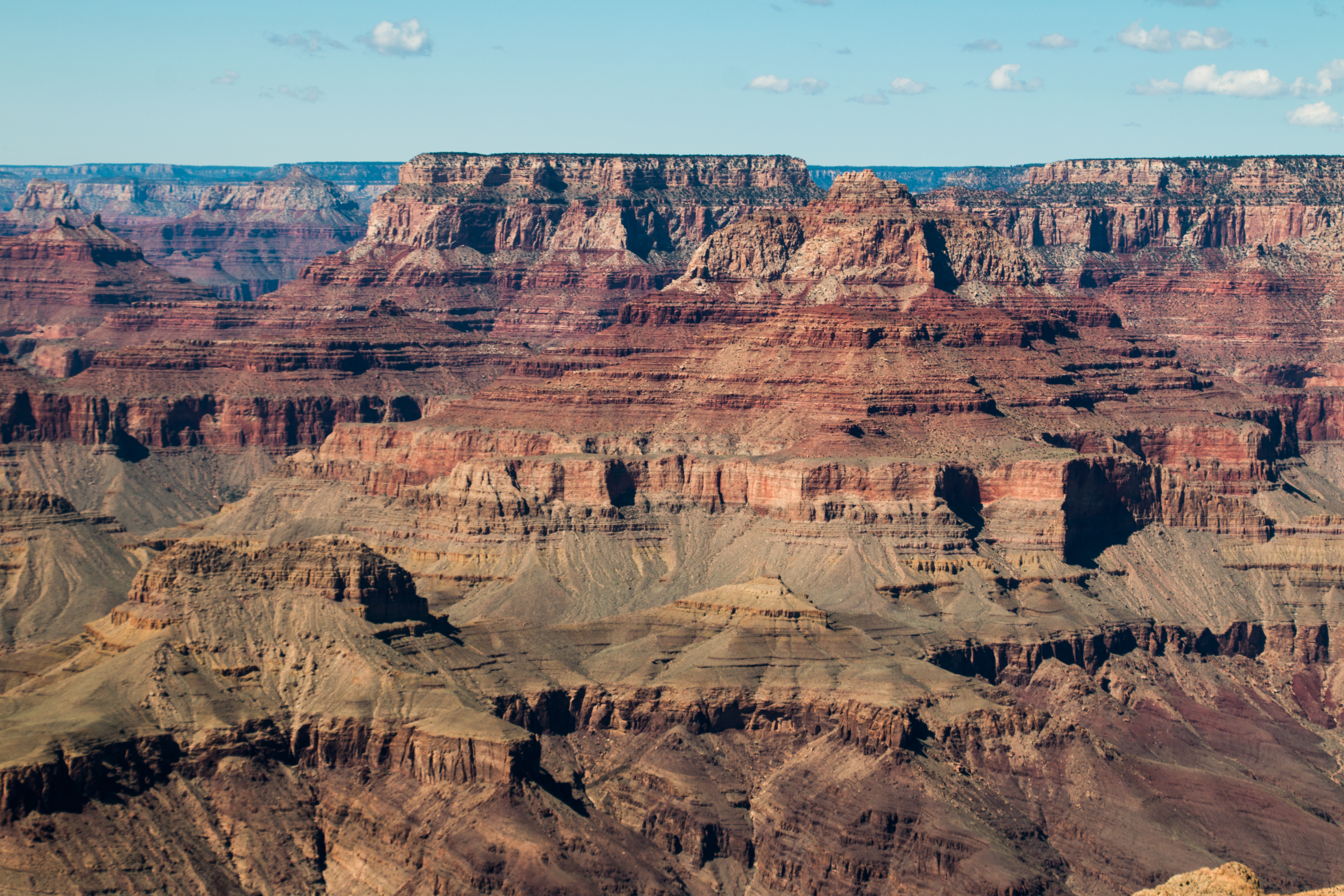
Solomon Temple in lower left. From the southeast.
Wotans Throne, Vishnu Temple, and Rama Shrine in the center.

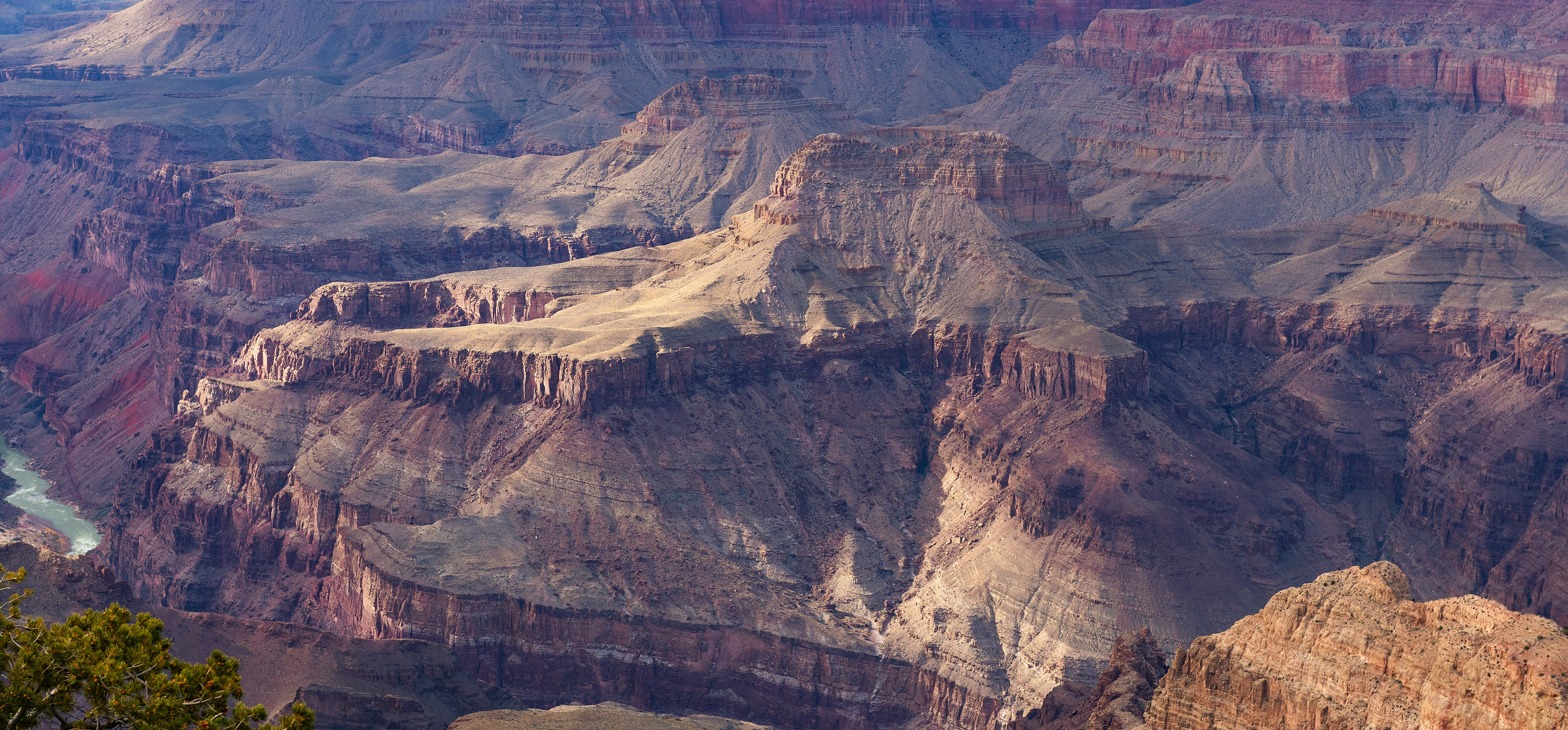
East-southeast aspect
