= Newberry Butte =

Landform in the Grand Canyon, Arizona

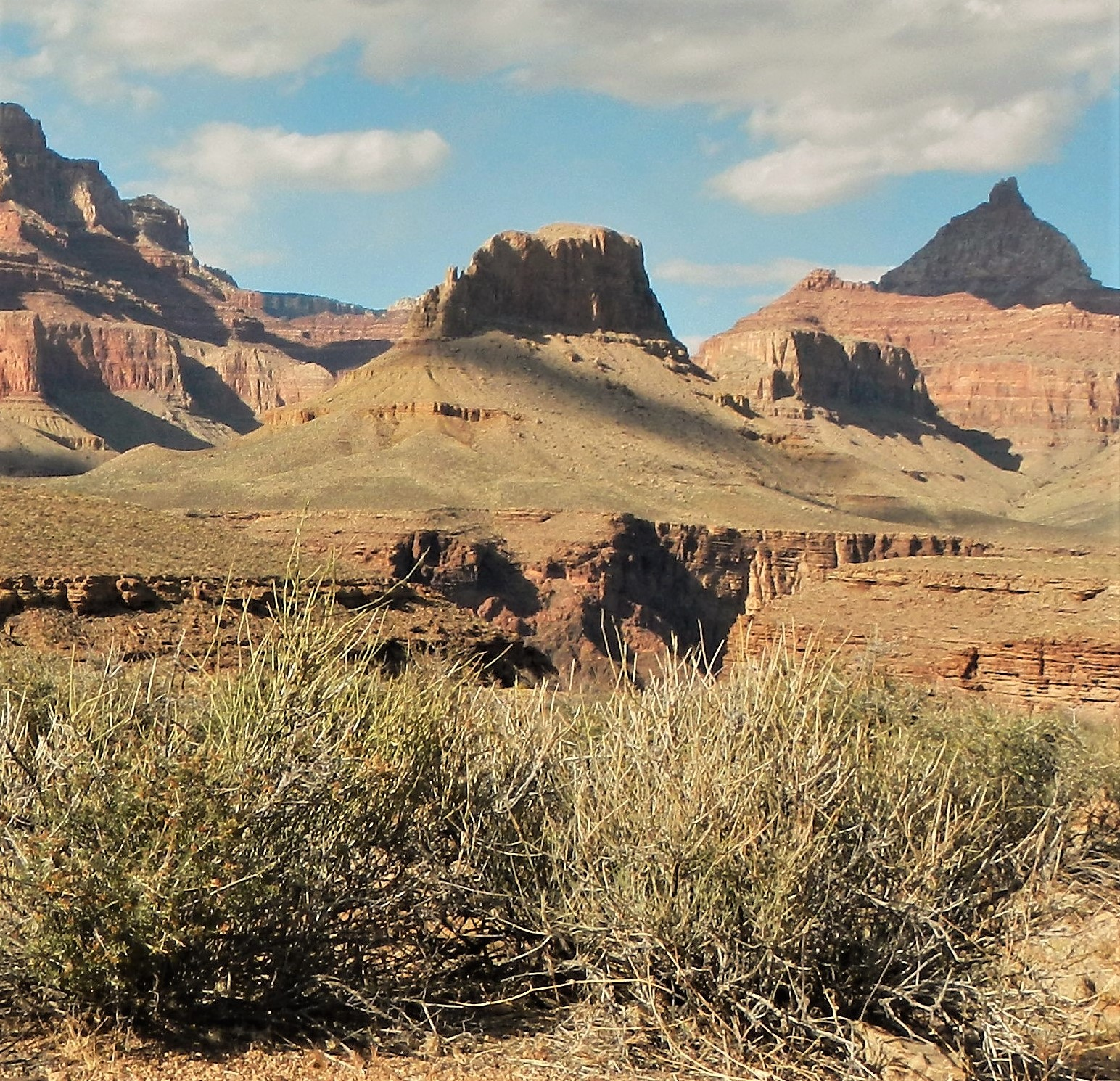
- South aspect, (Vishnu Temple to right)

Highest point
- Elevation: 5,105 ft (1,556 m)
- Prominence: 645 ft (197 m)
- Parent peak: Peak 5659
- Isolation: 1.29 mi (2.08 km)
- Coordinates: 36°03′43″N 111°58′23″W

Geography
- Location within Arizona Location within the United States
- Country: United States
- State: Arizona
- County: Coconino
- Protected area: Grand Canyon National Park
- Parent range: Kaibab Plateau; Colorado Plateau
- Topo map: USGS Cape Royal

Geology
- Rock type: Redwall Limestone

Climbing
- First ascent: 1963 by Harvey Butchart
- Easiest route: class 4 climbing

Newberry Butte is a 5,105-foot-elevation (1,556-meter) summit located in the Grand Canyon, in Coconino County of northern Arizona, US. It is situated 4.5 miles north of the South Rim's Grandview Point, three miles southwest of Vishnu Temple, and 2.5 miles south of Wotans Throne. Topographic relief is significant as it rises over 2,500 feet (760 meters) above the Colorado River and Granite Gorge in one mile. According to the Köppen climate classification system, Newberry Butte is located in a Cold semi-arid climate zone.

== Etymology ==
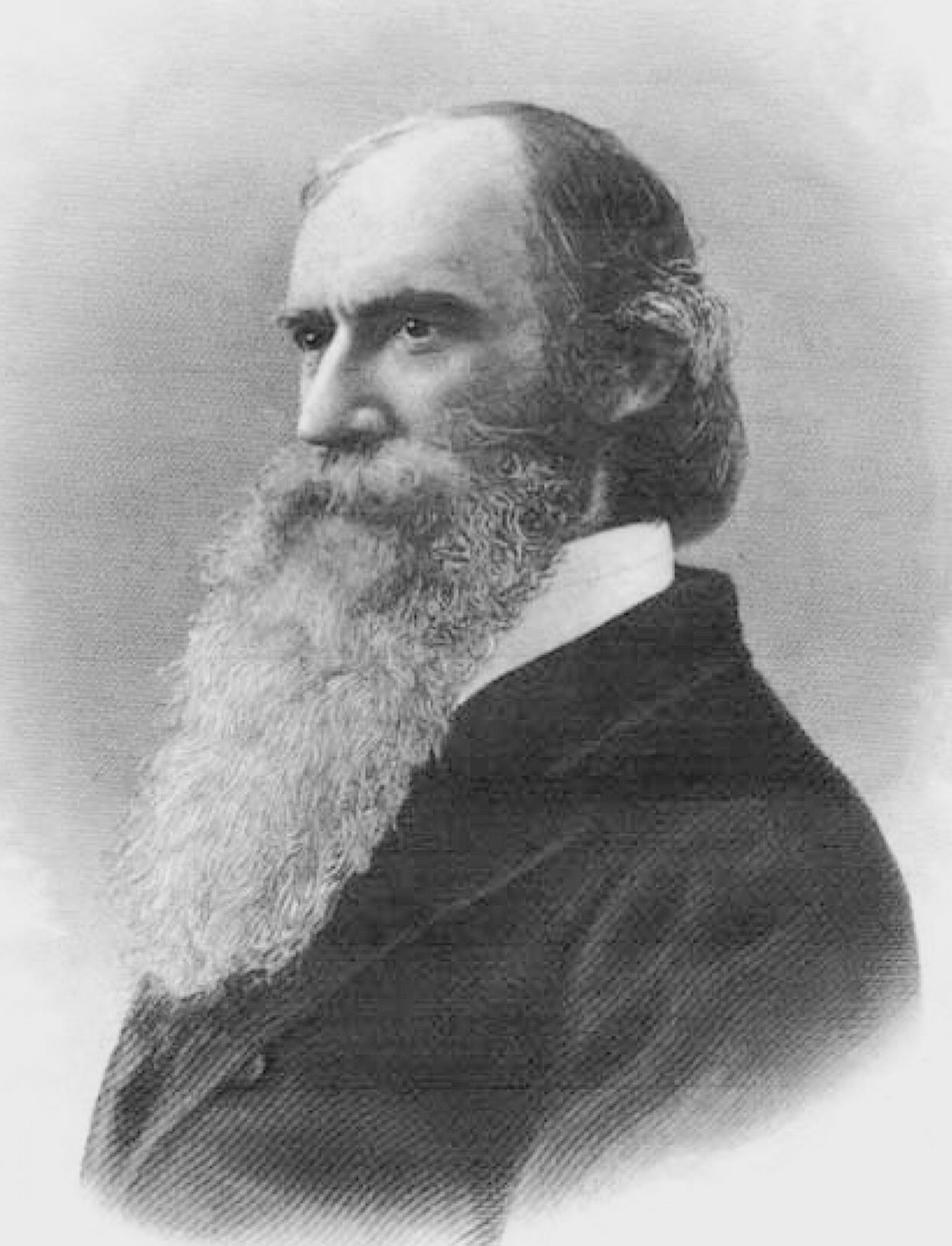
Newberry

Newberry Butte is named for John Strong Newberry (1822–1892), the geologist for an 1858 expedition headed by Lieutenant Joseph Christmas Ives which explored the Colorado River up to the lower Grand Canyon. After returning, Newberry convinced fellow geologist John Wesley Powell that a boat run through the Grand Canyon to complete the survey would be worth the risk. Powell would later lead the Powell Geographic Expedition of 1869 to explore the region. This geographical feature's name was officially adopted in 1906 by the U.S. Board on Geographic Names.

== Geology ==
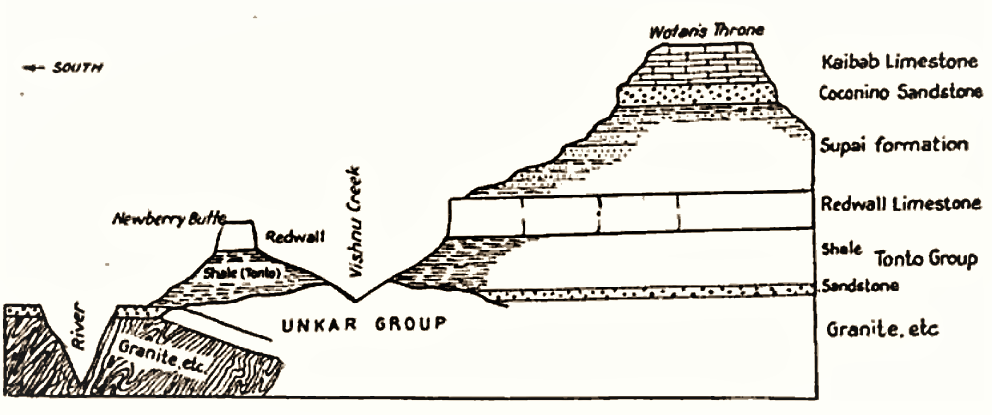

This butte is an erosional remnant composed of Mississippian Redwall Limestone, which overlays the Cambrian Tonto Group. Precipitation runoff from Newberry Butte drains southwest to the Colorado River via Vishnu Creek.

== Gallery ==
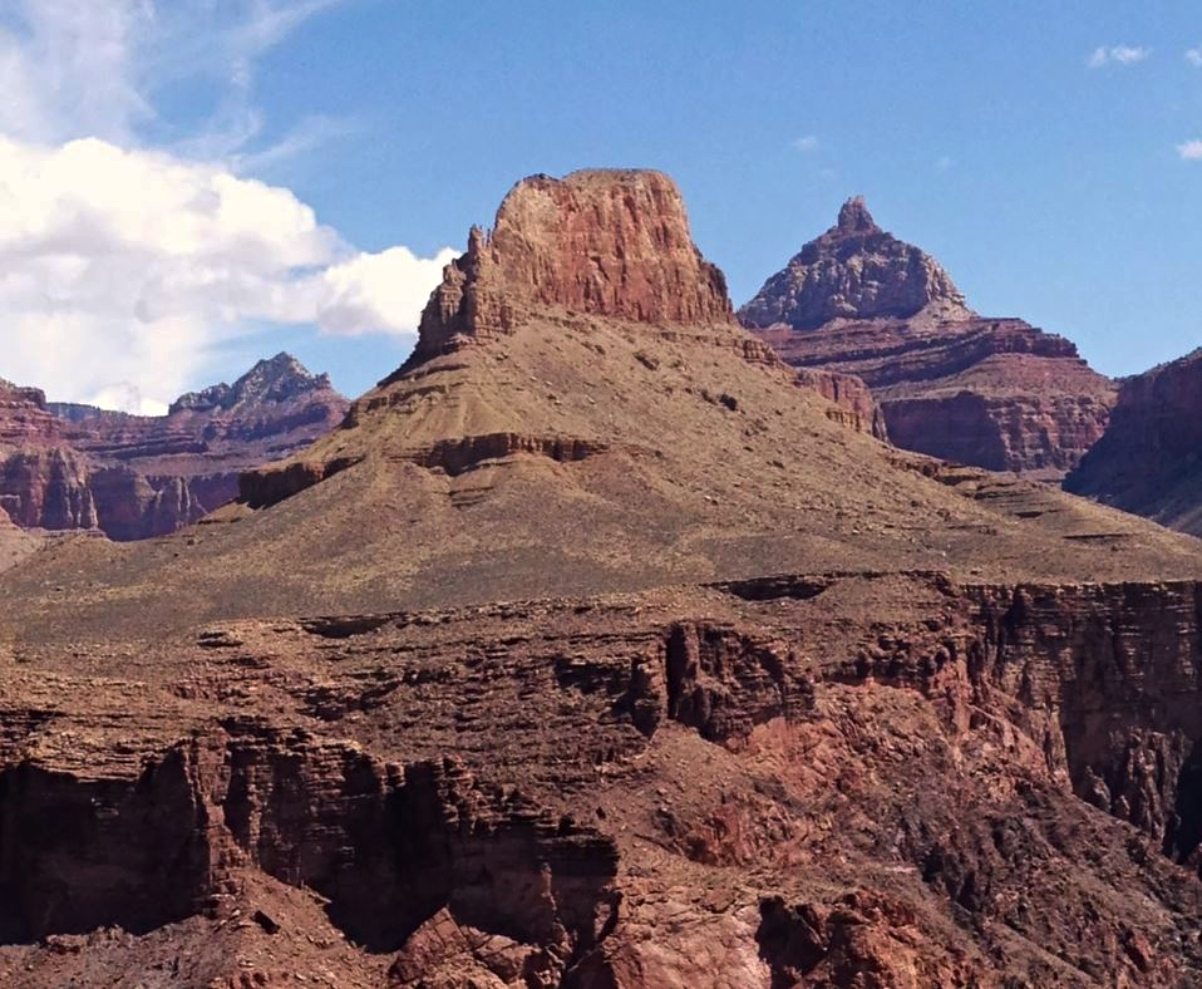
Newberry Butte (Vishnu Temple to right)

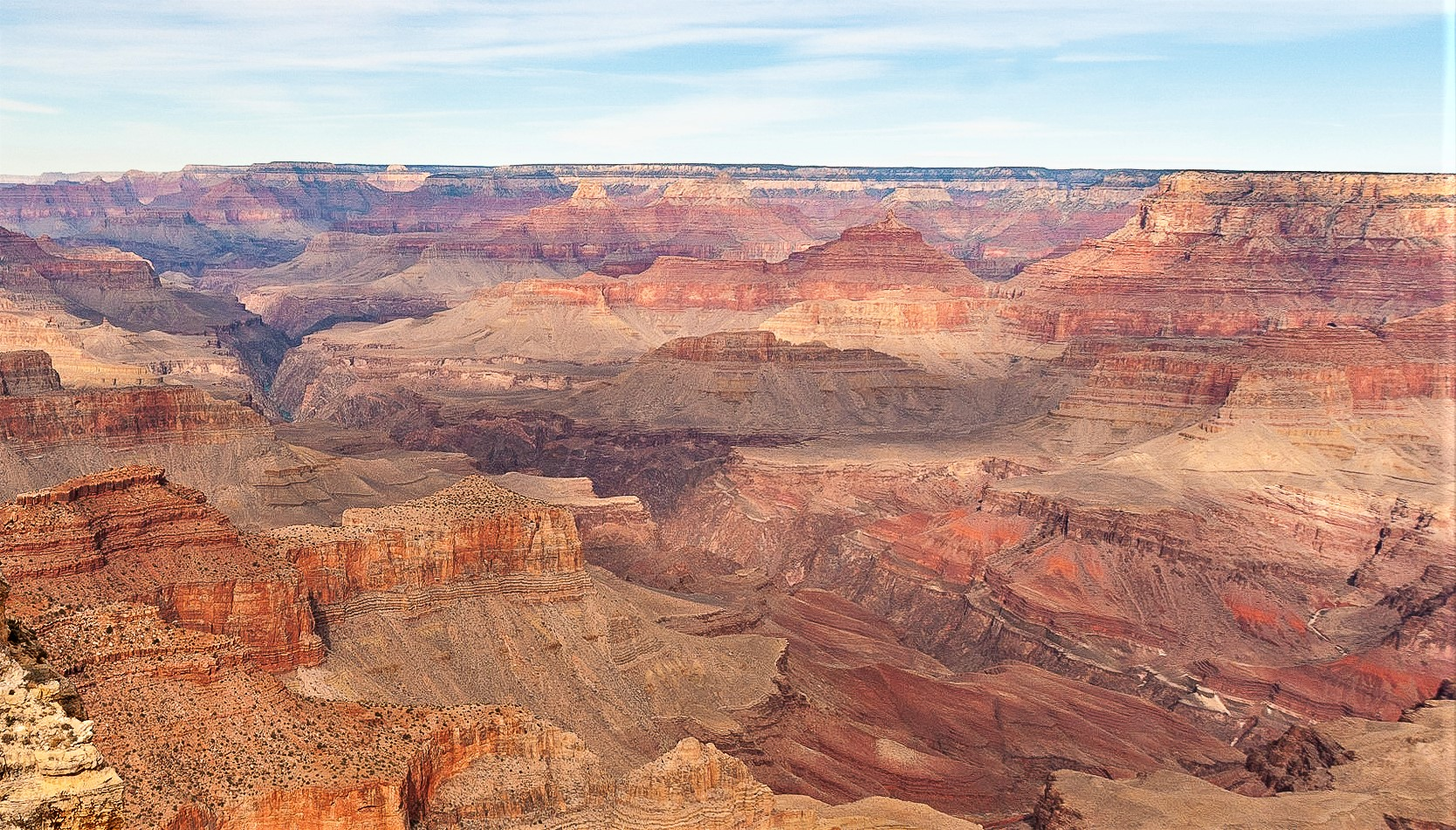
Newberry Butte (centered in bullseye) seen from Moran Point

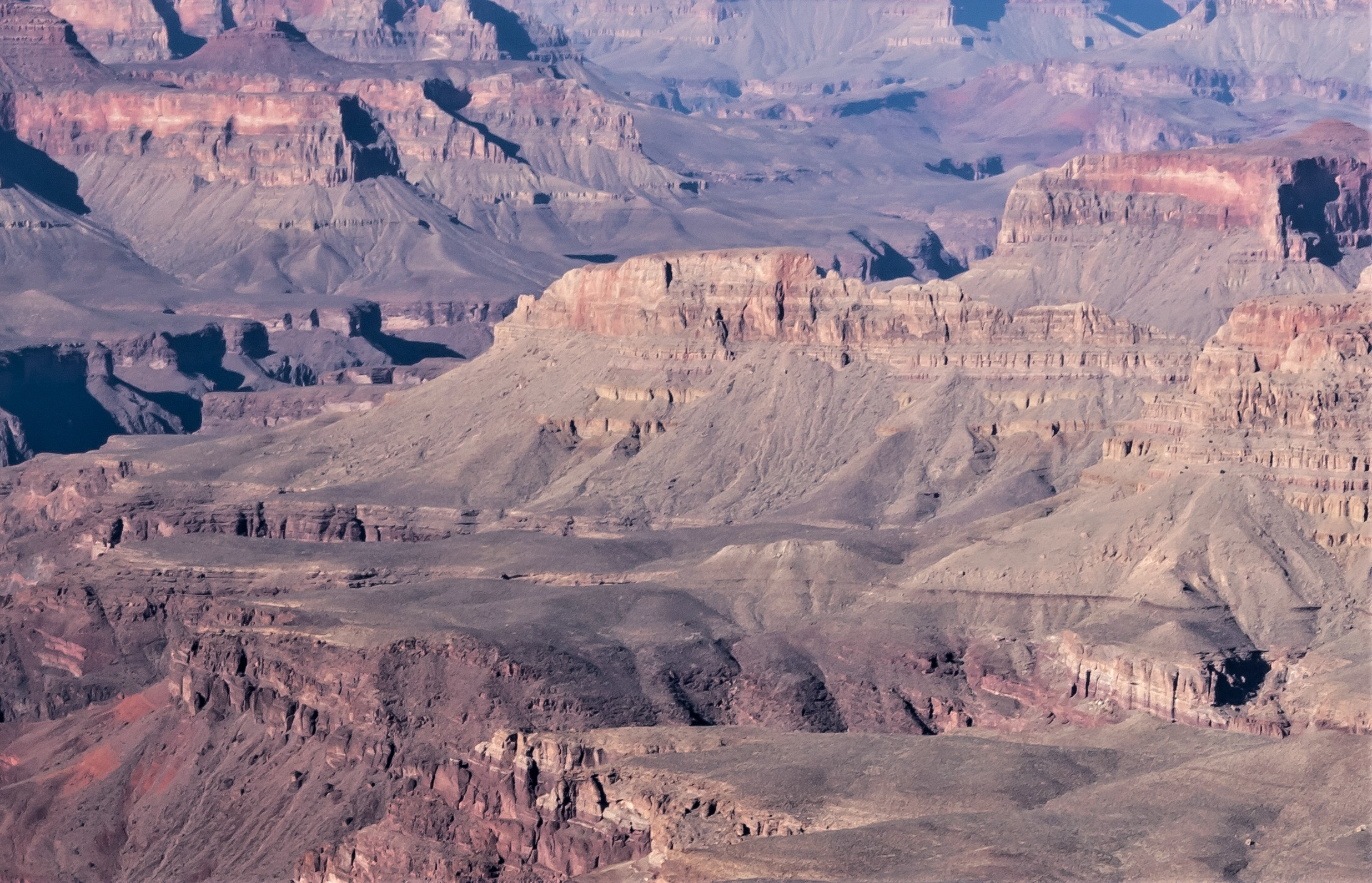
East aspect

== See also ==
- Geology of the Grand Canyon area
- Solomon Temple
