= Newbury =

Newbury may refer to:

== Places ==
=== United Kingdom ===
- Newbury, Berkshire, a town
- Newbury (district), Berkshire, a district formed in 1974
- Newbury (UK Parliament constituency)
- Newbury, Kent, a hamlet
- Newbury, Somerset, a UK location
- Newbury Park, London

=== United States ===
- Newbury, Connecticut, former name of Brookfield
- Newbury, Kansas, an unincorporated community
- Newbury, Massachusetts, a town
- Newbury, New Hampshire, a town
- Newbury (town), Vermont
  - Newbury (village), Vermont, within the town
- Newbury Park, California
- Newbury Street, a street in Boston, Massachusetts
- Newbury Township, LaGrange County, Indiana
- Newbury Township, Geauga County, Ohio

=== Elsewhere ===
- Newbury, Victoria, Australia, a locality
- Newbury, Ontario, Canada, a village
- Newbury, New Zealand, a rural community

== Schools ==
- Newbury Biblical Institute, renamed Boston University in 1869
- Newbury Seminary, the oldest predecessor of Vermont College of Fine Arts
- Newbury College (England), a further education college
- Newbury College (United States), a career-focused college in Brookline, Massachusetts
- Newbury High School, a former school in Newbury Township, Geauga County, Ohio

== Sports ==
- Newbury Racecourse, adjoining Newbury, Berkshire, UK
- Newbury F.C., a football club in Newbury, Berkshire
- A.F.C. Newbury, a short-lived football club in Newbury, Berkshire
- Newbury R.F.C., a rugby union club in Newbury, Berkshire

== Transportation ==
- Newbury Buses, a bus brand
- Newbury bypass, which bypasses Newbury, Berkshire, UK
- Newbury Manflier, a human-powered aircraft designed by Nicholas Goodhart
- Newbury Park tube station
- Newbury railway station
- Newbury Road, the main street in Newbury Park, California
- Newbury Street, Boston, Massachusetts

== Military ==
- First Battle of Newbury
- Second Battle of Newbury
- HMS Newbury, several ships of the Royal Navy

== People ==
- Newbury (surname)

== Other uses ==
- Newbery Medal, an award for children's literature
- Newbury Castle, west of Newbury, Berkshire
- The Newbury Boston, a historic luxury hotel
- Newbury Dam, South Africa

== See also ==
- New Bury, a suburb of Farnworth in the Bolton district of Greater Manchester
- Newbery (disambiguation)
- Newberry (disambiguation)
