= Krishna Shrine =

Landform in the Grand Canyon, Arizona

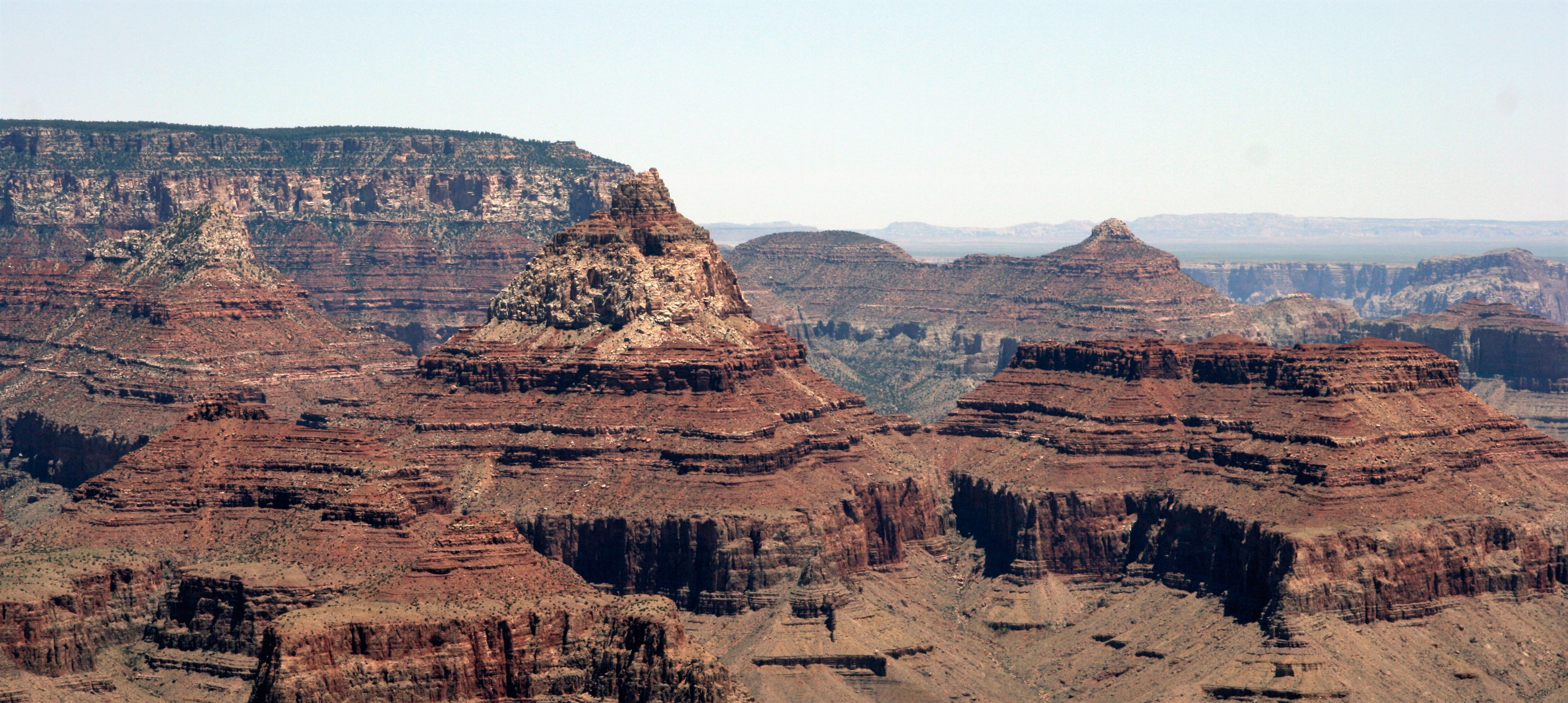
- Krishna, Vishnu, & Rama prominences (Freya Castle at left rear)

Highest point
- Elevation: 6,131 ft (1,869 m)
- Prominence: 671 ft (205 m)
- Parent peak: Vishnu Temple
- Isolation: 0.93 mi (1.50 km)
- Coordinates: 36.0816509°N 111.9498858°W

Geography
- Location within Arizona Location within the United States
- Location: Grand Canyon National Park; Coconino County, Arizona, US
- Parent range: Kaibab Plateau (Walhalla Plateau); Colorado Plateau
- Topo map: USGS Cape Royal

Geology
- Rock age: Permian down to Cambrian
- Mountain type(s): sedimentary rock: sandstone, siltstone, mudstone, limestone, shale
- Rock type(s): Esplanade Sandstone-(cliff-prominence-debris); Supai Group, Redwall Limestone, Tonto Group-(3 units), 3_Muav Limestone, 2_Bright Angel Shale

Climbing
- First ascent: September 5, 1962 Harvey Butchart

Krishna Shrine is a 6,131-foot-elevation summit located in the eastern Grand Canyon, in Coconino County of northern Arizona, US. The landform is attached at the southwest to the Vishnu Temple massif, about 1.0 mi distant. Krishna Shrine is about 3.0 mi south of the Cape Royal overlook, Walhalla Plateau (southeast Kaibab Plateau, North Rim). A twin landform occupies the southeast of Vishnu Temple, the Rama Shrine. Krishna Shrine towers about 4,000 ft above the Colorado River, about 2.0 miles south. Both Shrines, east and west, and Vishnu Temple, center, are at the headwater drainage of Asbestos Canyon. At the southwest of Krishna, on an extending arm of Redwall Limestone is a short unnamed drainage; (at the southwest is Newberry Butte at the Colorado River, and Granite Gorge). The west flank of Krishna Shrine drains into the long southwest-trending Vishnu Canyon and Creek, which comes from Freya Castle and the Walhalla Plateau, South Rim.

Like Rama Shrine (at east), Krishna Shrine is composed of the same geology units: a massif of 4-unit Supai Group, upon the platform of the cliff-former (and platform-former) Redwall Limestone. The upper surface of the landform is triangle-shaped-(northwest), and a small eroded peak-(southeast); the high-point prominence is at the northwest and is a remainder, fractured cliff-peak of the Supai, unit 4, the cliff-forming Esplanade Sandstone famous in the Grand Canyon for forming platforms. (The prominence-platform of Rama Shrine is an extensive Esplanade layer (with slope-former debris of soft Hermit Shale).)

== Geology ==
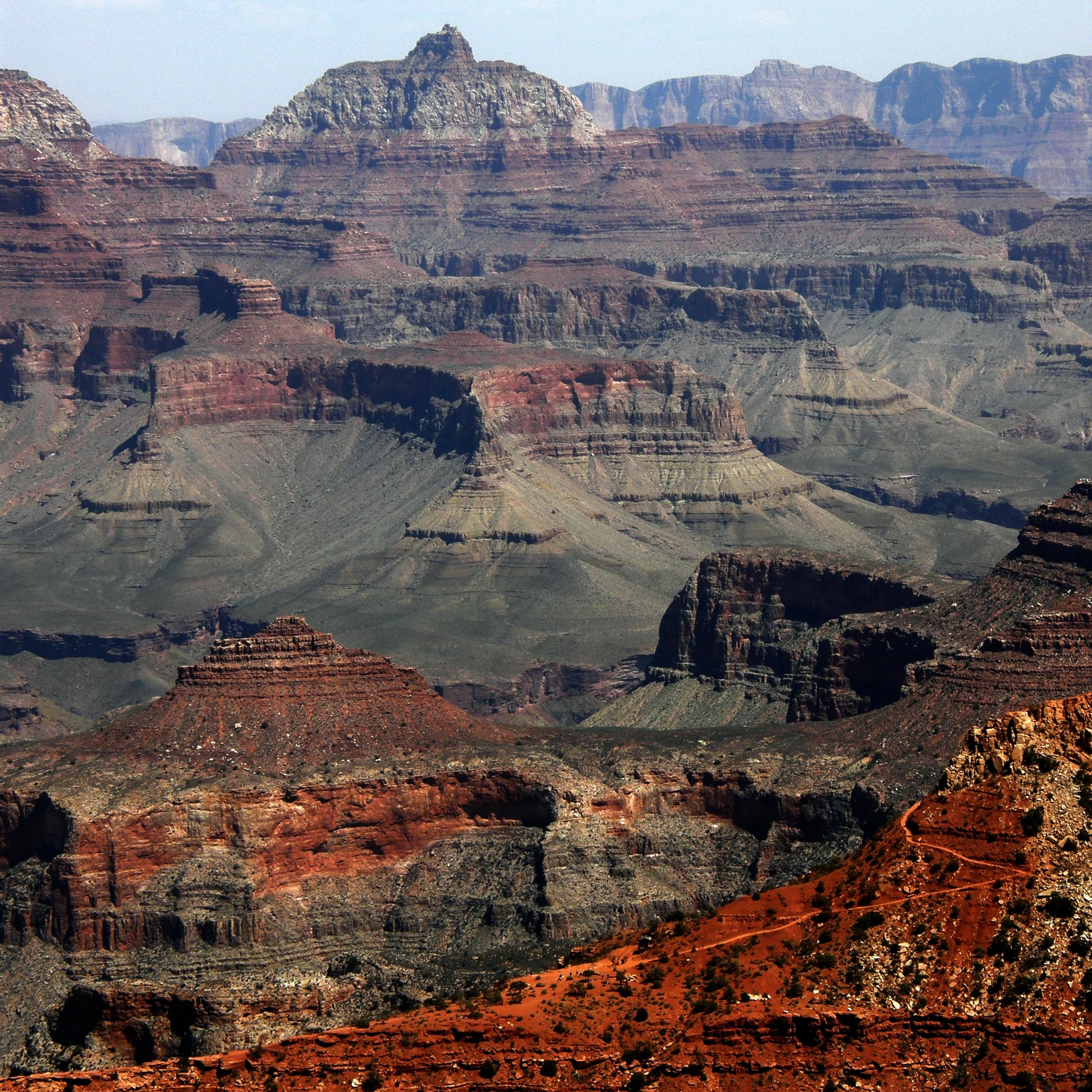
Bright Angel Shale slopes below Redwall (on short Muav Limestone cliff & platform) (linear Dunn Butte prominence attached south of Angels Gate-(photo left))

Closeup photos of Krishna Shrine show the interlayering of the red-orange Supai Group. The Supai Group is on the upper platform of the Redwall Limestone. At Krishna Shrine, the Redwall Limestone cliffs are stained blackish, not red.
