= John Strong Newberry =

American physician, geologist and paleontologist

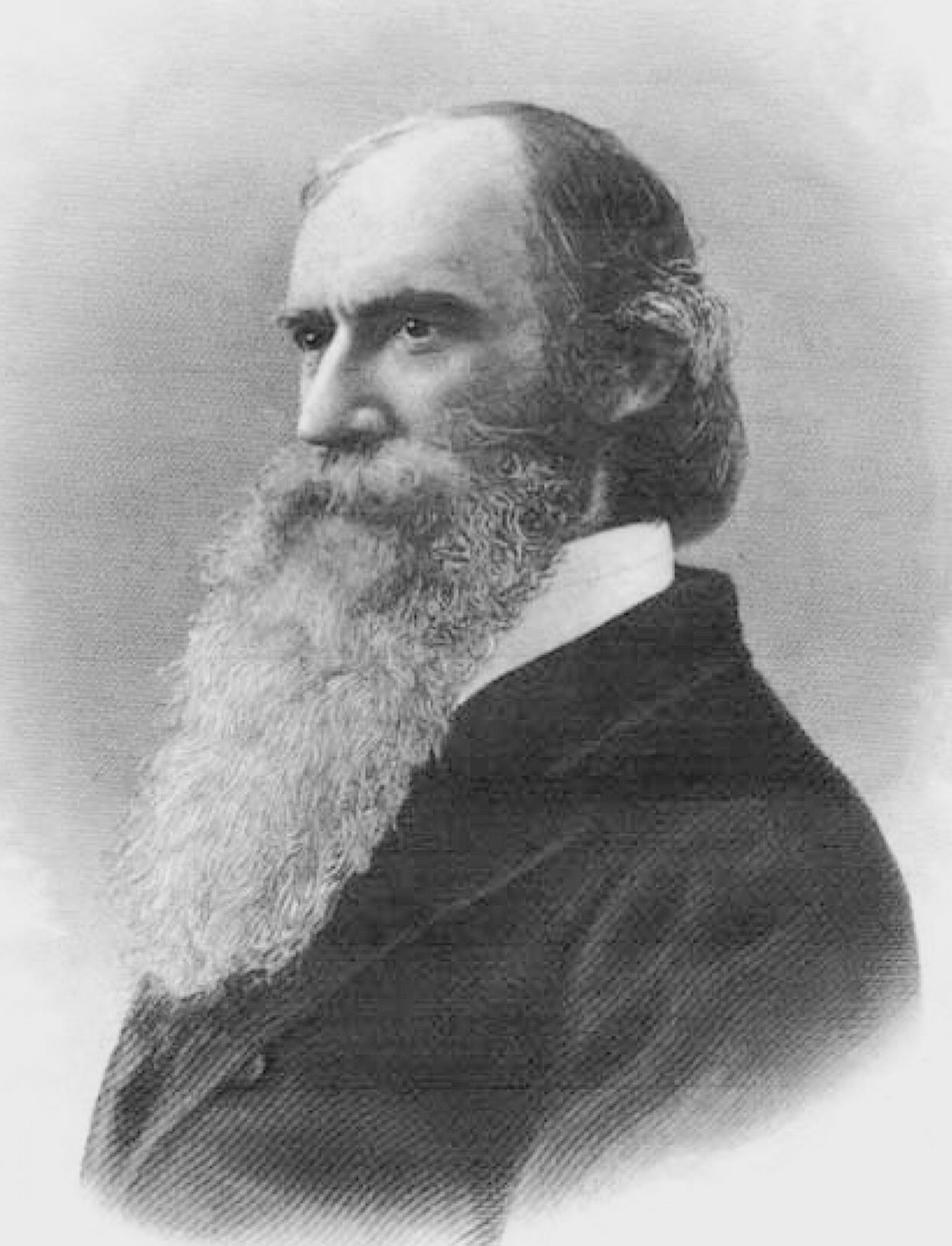

Signature
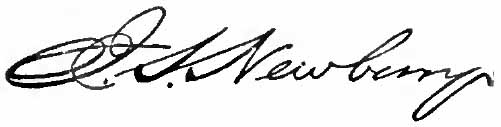

John Strong Newberry (December 22, 1822 – December 7, 1892) was an American physician, geologist and paleontologist. He participated as a naturalist and surgeon on three expeditions to explore and survey the western United States. During the Civil War he served in the US Sanitary Commission and was appointed secretary of the western department of the commission. After the war he became professor of geology and paleontology at Columbia University School of Mines and chief geologist of the Geological Survey of Ohio.

== Biography ==
John Strong Newberry was born in Windsor, Connecticut, to Henry and Elizabeth Strong. At the age of two he moved with his family to northeastern Ohio where his father opened a coal mining business. The fossils found in the coal deposits stimulated his interest in science and a visit in 1841 with James Hall, an eminent geologist and paleontologist, furthered his interests. He graduated from Western Reserve College in 1846 and from Cleveland Medical School in 1848. That same year he married Sarah Gaylord and sailed with her to Paris where he spent the next two years of studying medicine and natural history. Upon his return in 1851, he established a successful medical practice in Cleveland.

In 1855, he joined an exploring expedition under Lieutenant Williamson, sent out by the War Department to examine the country between San Francisco and the Columbia River. In 1857–58 he acted as geologist to an expedition headed by Lieutenant Joseph Christmas Ives, sent out to explore the Colorado River. He served as naturalist on an expedition in 1859 under Captain John N. Macomb, which explored southwestern Colorado and adjacent parts of Utah, Arizona, and New Mexico, finding the remains of the dinosaur Dystrophaeus. He was the first geologist known to visit the Grand Canyon. He was called to a professorship at Columbian (now George Washington) University in 1857. Newberry was elected a member of the American Antiquarian Society in 1860.

On 14 June 1861, he was elected a member of the United States Sanitary Commission due to his medical knowledge and experience in the army. He made his first sanitary inspection of troops in the west at Cairo, Illinois, in connection with Rev. Henry W. Bellows and Dr. William H. Mussey. In September 1861, he resigned from the Army and became secretary of the Western Department of the Sanitary Commission, having supervision of all the work of the commission in the Mississippi Valley, with headquarters in Louisville, Kentucky.

The first distributing depot in the west was opened in Wheeling, West Virginia, on 8 October and was the source from which the hospitals at Wheeling, Clarksburg, Parkersburg, and other military points were supplied with a large part of their equipment. Dr. Newberry organized the whole of the comprehensive machinery of the commission in the large section that was committed to his care, and by his practical suggestions and enthusiasm stimulated the formation of the tributary societies. From 1 September 1861 until 1 July 1866, he expended more than $800,000 in money, and distributed hospital stores that were valued at more than $5,000,000. During this time the names of more than 850,000 soldiers were collected and recorded in the hospital directory in Louisville, and food and shelter were given in the various homes of the commission to more than 1,000,000 soldiers, for whom no other adequate provision was made.

In 1866 he was offered the chair of geology and paleontology in the School of Mines, Columbia College (now Columbia University), which he accepted and held for 24 years. During his connection with this institution, he created a museum of over 100,000 specimens, principally collected by himself, which served to illustrate his lectures in paleontology and economic geology. At that time, it contained the best representations of the mineral resources of the United States to be found anywhere, as well as many unique and remarkable fossils. Much of this collection was later incorporated in the collection of the American Museum of Natural History.

His other positions were: chief geologist of the Geological Survey of Ohio; a member of the Illinois Geological Survey; president of the American Association for the Advancement of Science; president of the New York Academy of Sciences; and president of the Torrey Botanical Club. During the World's fair in Philadelphia in 1876 he was one of the judges. In 1887, he was elected an Associate Fellow of the American Academy of Arts and Sciences. In 1867, he was elected as a member of the American Philosophical Society. He assisted in the organization of the Geological Society of America at Cleveland in 1888, and served on the commission to organize an international geological congress, of which he was president in 1891. The Murchison Medal of the Geological Society of London was awarded to him in 1888.

Newberry died at New Haven on December 7, 1892.

== Legacy ==
Newberry Crater, Oregon (now in the Newberry National Volcanic Monument) was named in his honor in 1903.

Newberry Butte, located within the Grand Canyon, was named in his honor in 1906.

A fish, Eucyclogobius newberryi, the Northern tidewater goby was named in his honor.

== Works ==
Newberry's separate papers contributed to various periodicals included upward of 200 titles, chiefly in the fields of geology and paleontology, but also in zoology and botany. Newberry named more than 50 species of Paleozoic age fossil vertebrates and plants, some of which have been subsequently synonymized or renamed because of homonymy. In addition, he authored or contributed to:

- Reports of Explorations and Surveys to Ascertain the Most Practical and Economic Route for a Railroad from the Mississippi River to the Pacific Coast, Made in 1855–56 (Washington, 1857). His reports on the geology, botany, and zoology of northern California are contained in the sixth volume.
- Report on the Colorado River of the West, Explored in 1857–58 (Washington, 1861). His observations formed the most interesting material that was gathered by the expedition, and made up fully half of this report.
- Reports of the Exploring Expedition from Santa Fé to the Junction of the Grande and Green Rivers (Washington, 1876). A large area of this country was before unknown, but proved to be rich in minerals and to be covered with the traces of an ancient civilization. This information was his contribution to this report.
- The Rock Oils of Ohio (1859)
- Catalogue of the Flowering Plants and Ferns of Ohio (1860)
- Report of the Geological Survey of Ohio. Volume I, Geology and Palaeontology. Part II Palaeontology (1873)
- Report of the Geological Survey of Ohio. Volume II, Geology and Palaeontology. Part II Palaeontology (1875)
- The U. S. Sanitary Commission in the Valley of the Mississippi (Cleveland, 1871)
- Iron Resources of the United States (1874)
- The Structure and Relations of Dinichthys (1875)
- Report on the Fossil Fishes Collected on the Illinois Geological Survey (1886)
- The flora of the Amboy Clays. (Abstract) (1886)
- Fossil Fishes and Fossil Plants of the Triassic Rocks of New Jersey and the Connecticut Valley (1888)
- Paleozoic Fishes of North America (1889)
- Later Extinct Floras (1898)
