= Newbury Dam =

Coordinates: 29°13′49.3″S 27°13′29.4″E

Newberry Dam
- Location: South Africa

Newbury Dam is a dam in South Africa.

== See also ==
- List of reservoirs and dams in South Africa
