= Tommy Newberry =

American writer

Thomas Newberry is the author of seven books, including the New York Times bestseller The 4:8 Principle and Success is Not an Accident, both of which have been translated into multiple of languages.

He is the president of the 1% Club, which was developed to assist entrepreneurs and their families in business leadership.

The 4:8 Principle is a Wall Street Journal and New York Times bestseller.

In addition to The 4:8 Principle, Newberry has authored Success is Not an Accident, 366 Days of Wisdom, Inspiration, and The War on Success. Newberry frequently speaks at schools, churches, business conferences, and has appeared as a guest on over 200 radio and television programs, including Good News, Living the Life, Fox & Friends, The Lou Dobbs Show, Your World With Neil Cavuto, Janet Parshall’s America, The Fox News Strategy Room, Everyday with Lisa & Marcus and many others.

He is also the founder of the Couples Planning Retreat, a luxury marriage retreat.

Newberry is also an active motivational speaker.
