= Francis Newbery =

Francis Newbery may refer to:

- Francis Newbery (publisher) (1743–1818), English publisher, son of John Newbery
- Francis Newbery, publisher of The Vicar of Wakefield, nephew of John Newbery
- Francis Henry Newbery (1855–1946), or Fra Newbery, painter and director of the Glasgow School of Art, 1885–1917
