= Newbury (surname) =

Newbury is an English surname. Within the United States, it is the name of 0.001 per cent of the population. Following the 1990 Census, the U.S. Census Bureau ranked the name Newbury as number 16,415 in its list of Frequently Occurring Surnames.

The name is cognate with the surname Newberry (in 1990 possessed by 0.005 per cent of the U.S. population and ranked number 2,359) and Newbery, which at number 55,231 in the rankings rounded to 0.000 per cent of the U.S. population. However, in the United Kingdom Newbury is the more usual spelling.

== Origin ==
Newbury/Newberry/Newbery means "new stronghold" (from Old English niwe, neowe, new, and buri, byri, fortified place).

In the United Kingdom, one town and a small number of villages have the name Newbury. However, the name of the hamlet of Newbury in the parish of Horningsham, Wiltshire, is of 17th-century origin: it was named for a family called Newbury. Other spellings of the name include Newborough and Newburgh.

== Pronunciation ==
In the United States, the usual pronunciation of the name Newbury is as three distinct syllables, as if spelt New-Berry; with the exception of the region of New England where it is pronounced "Newbry". However, in normal speech in the United Kingdom the name's pronunciation (both for places and people) is barely more than two syllables, either as if spelt Newbry or else with a slight uh sound after the -b-.

The same difference can be heard in the pronunciations of other names ending in -bury, such as Kingsbury, Hanbury, Salisbury, and Westbury.

== People named Newbury or Newbery ==
- A. C. Newbury (1886–1948), Australian Congregationalist minister
- Albert Ernest Newbury (1891–1941), Australian painter
- Christopher Newbury (born 1956), British politician
- Graham C. Newbury (1910–1985), American surgeon
- James Newbury (born 1978), Australian politician
- John Newbery (1713–1767), English publisher and namesake of the literary award
- Jorge Newbery (1875 – 1914), Argentine aviator, civil servant, engineer and scientist.
- Kris Newbury (born 1982), Canadian ice hockey player
- Mickey Newbury (1940–2002), American musician and composer
- Saul Newbury (1870–1950), American postage stamp collector
- Steve Newbury (born 1956), Welsh former snooker player
- William Spencer Newbury (1834–1915), mayor of Portland, Oregon

== See also ==
- Newbury (disambiguation)
- Jack O'Newbury, 15th and 16th century English merchant
- Newberry, another surname
