= Vishnu Temple (Grand Canyon) =

Landform in the Grand Canyon, Arizona

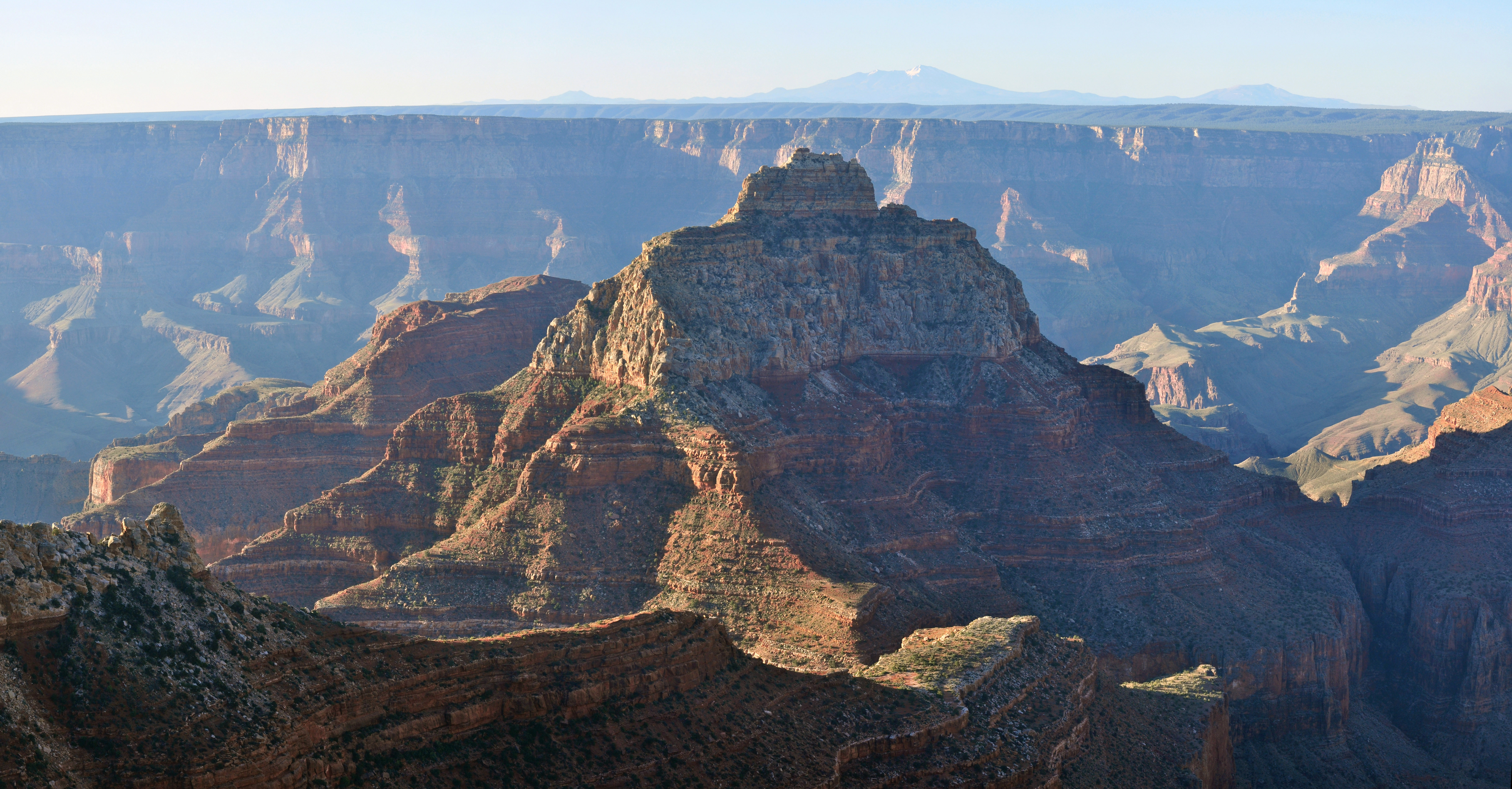
- North aspect, from Angels Window Overlook

Highest point
- Elevation: 7,533 ft (2,296 m)
- Prominence: 1,813 ft (553 m)
- Parent peak: Wotans Throne (7,740 ft)
- Isolation: 1.77 mi (2.85 km)
- Coordinates: 36°05′20″N 111°56′09″W

Geography
- Location within Arizona Location within the United States
- Country: United States
- State: Arizona
- County: Coconino
- Protected area: Grand Canyon National Park
- Parent range: Kaibab Plateau; Colorado Plateau
- Topo map: USGS Cape Royal

Geology
- Rock type: Coconino Sandstone

Climbing
- First ascent: 1945
- Easiest route: class 4 climbing

Vishnu Temple is a 7,533-foot-elevation (2,296-meter) summit located in the Grand Canyon, in Coconino County of Arizona, US.

== Description ==
Vishnu Temple is situated two miles south-southeast of the Cape Royal overlook on the canyon's North Rim, 1.5 mile south of Freya Castle, and two miles east-southeast of Wotans Throne, its nearest higher neighbor. It towers 4,900 feet (1,500 meters) above the Colorado River. According to the Köppen climate classification system, Vishnu Temple is located in a cold semi-arid climate zone. According to explorer Frederick Samuel Dellenbaugh, Vishnu Temple is "without doubt the most stupendous mass of nature's carving in the known world."

== History ==
Vishnu Temple is named for Vishnu, the Hindu deity, redeemer of the universe. This toponym was applied in 1880 by Clarence Dutton who thought this mountain resembled an "oriental" pagoda, when he began the tradition of naming geographical features in the Grand Canyon after mythological deities. This geographical feature's toponym was officially adopted in 1906 by the U.S. Board on Geographic Names. The first ascent of the summit was made by Merrel Clubb and his son on July 13, 1945.

== Geology ==
The summit of Vishnu Temple is composed of cream-colored, cliff-forming, Permian Coconino Sandstone with a Kaibab Limestone cupola caprock. The sandstone, which is the third-youngest of the strata in the Grand Canyon, was deposited 265 million years ago as sand dunes. Below the Coconino Sandstone is slope-forming, Permian Hermit Formation, which in turn overlays the Pennsylvanian-Permian Supai Group. Further down are strata of Mississippian Redwall Limestone, Cambrian Tonto Group, and finally Proterozoic Unkar Group at creek level. Precipitation runoff from Vishnu Temple drains south into the Colorado River via Vishnu Creek on its west side, and Unkar Creek on the east side.

== Gallery ==
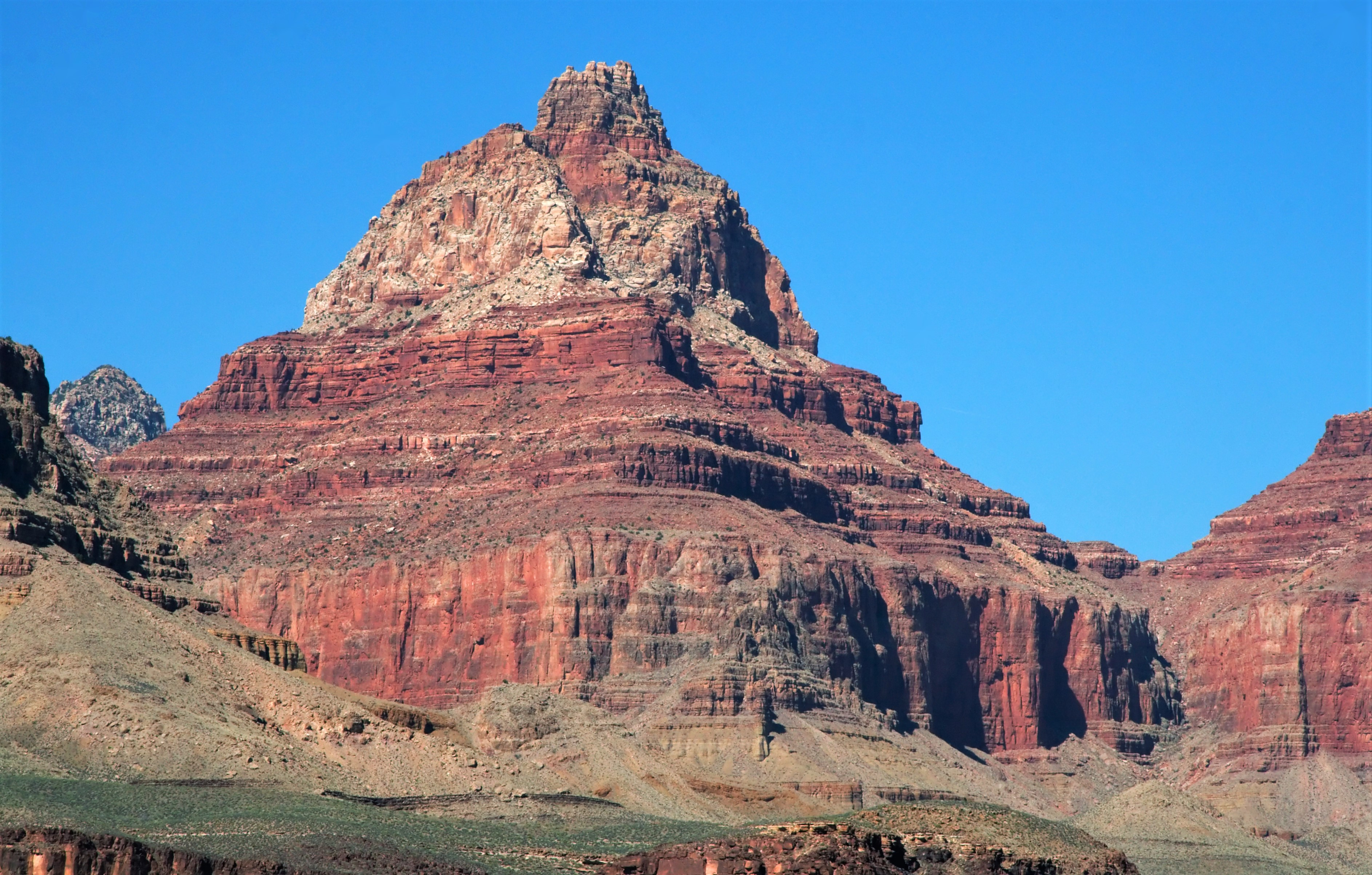
South aspect, from Tonto Trail

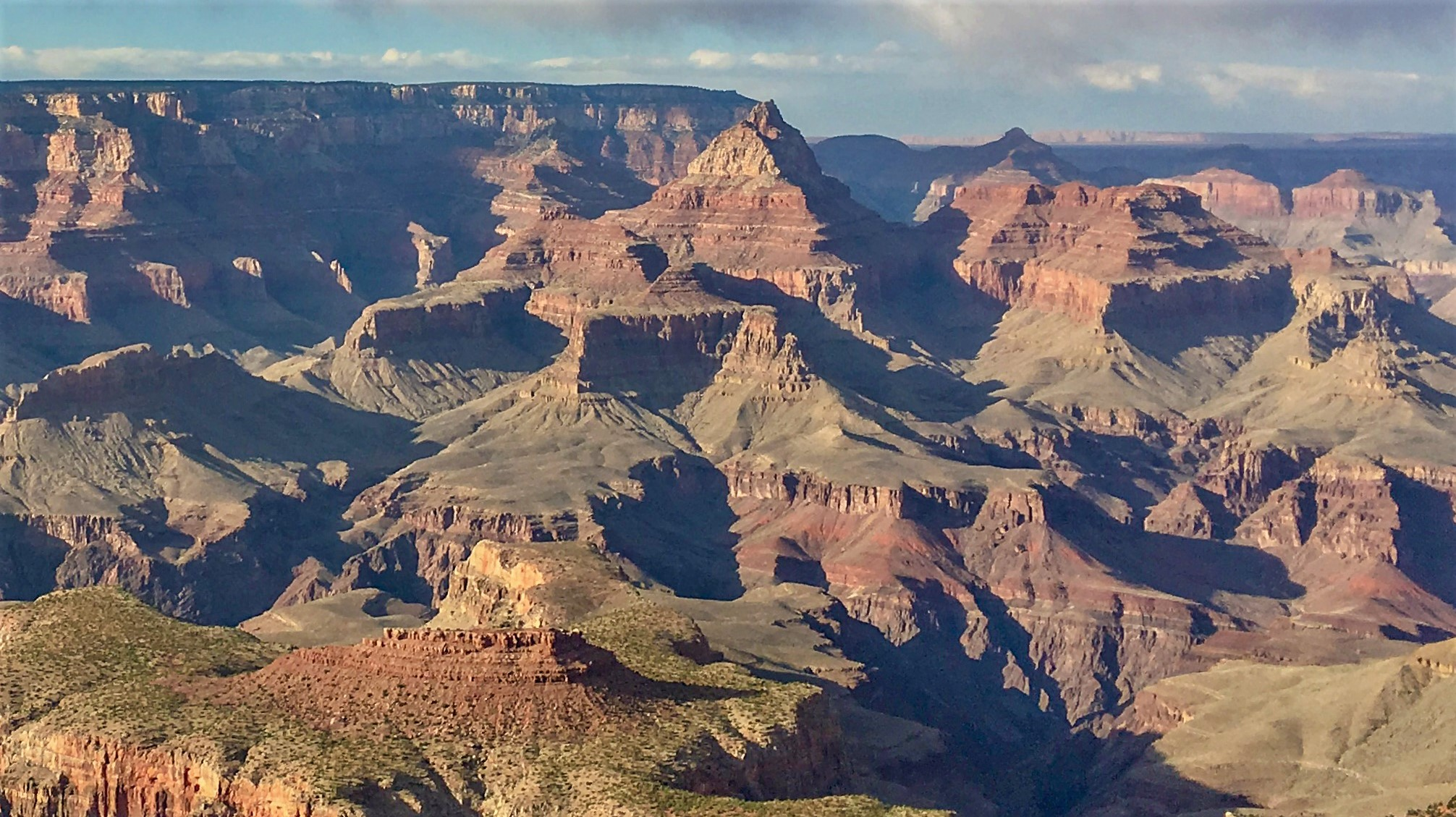
Vishnu Temple from Grandview Point

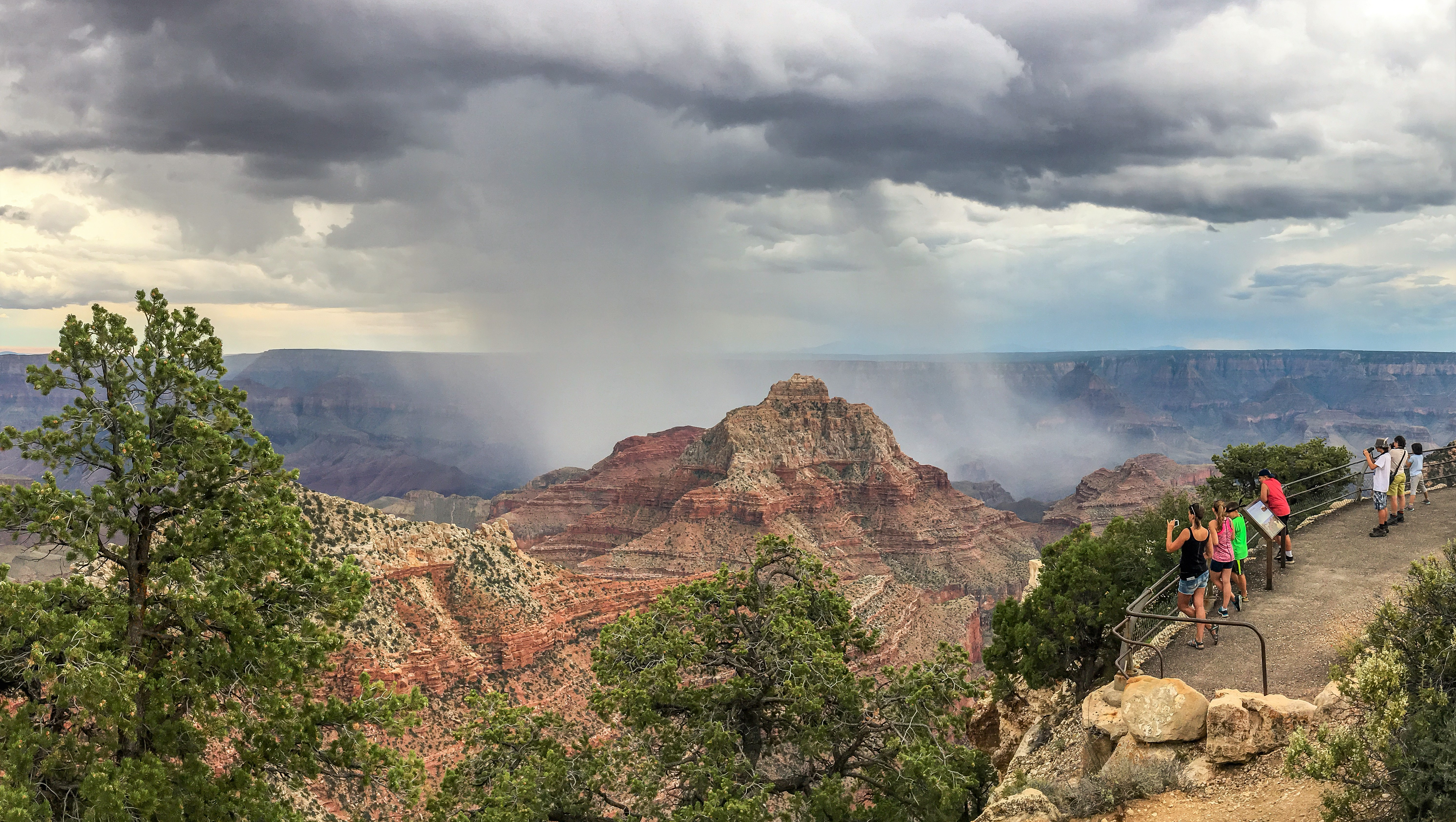
Vishnu Temple from Point Imperial

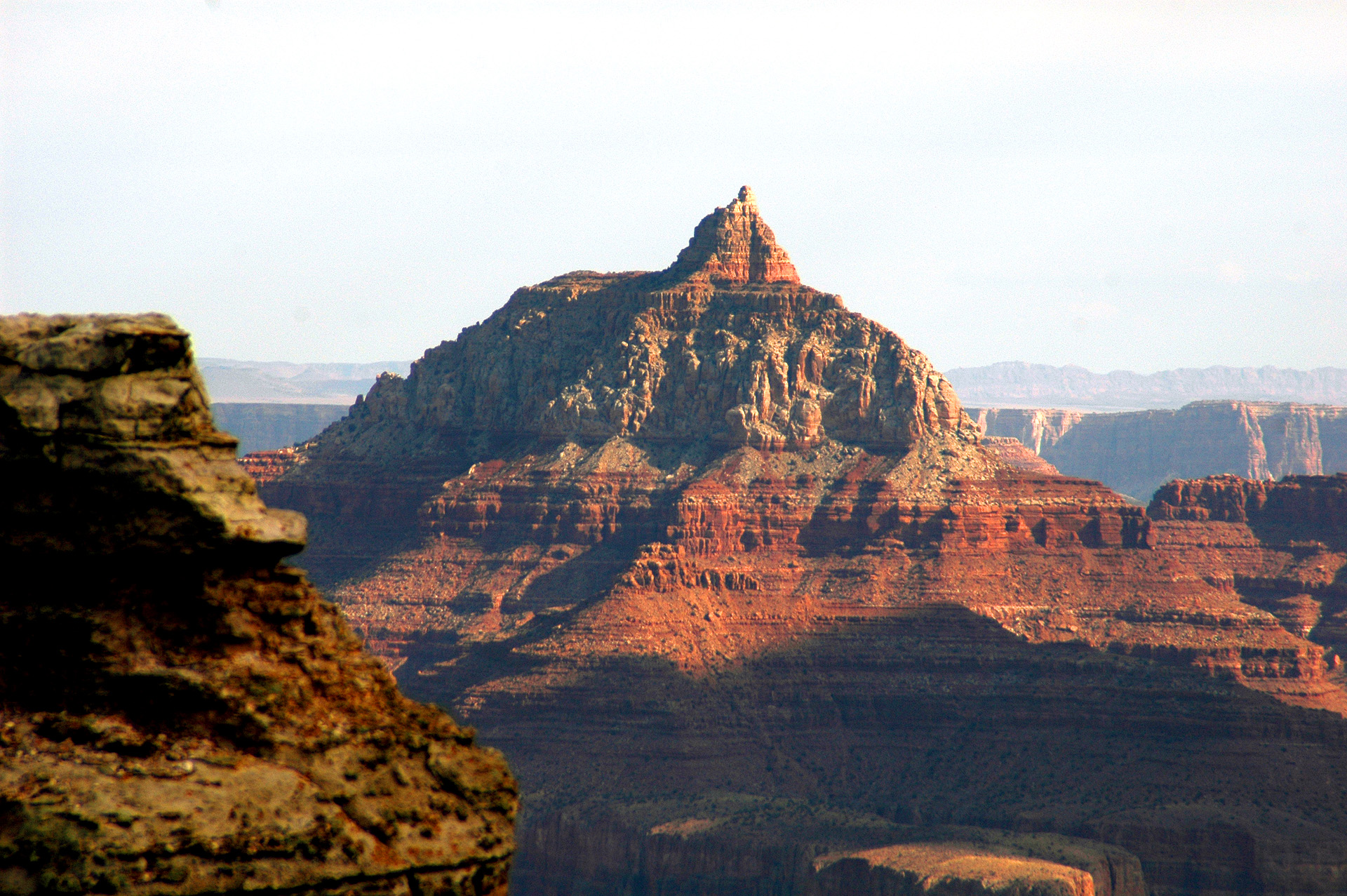

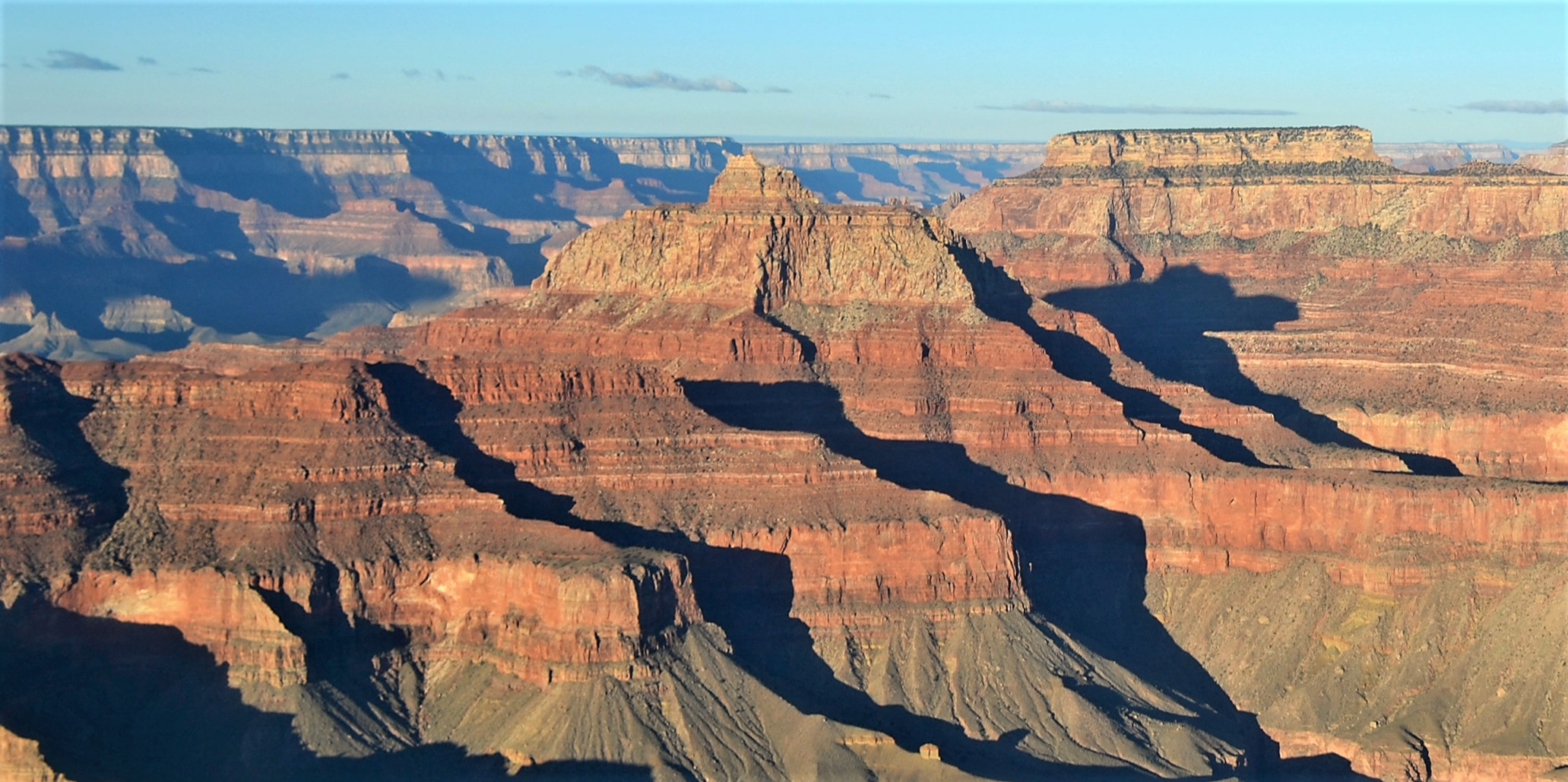
Aerial view of east aspect. (Wotans Throne behind)

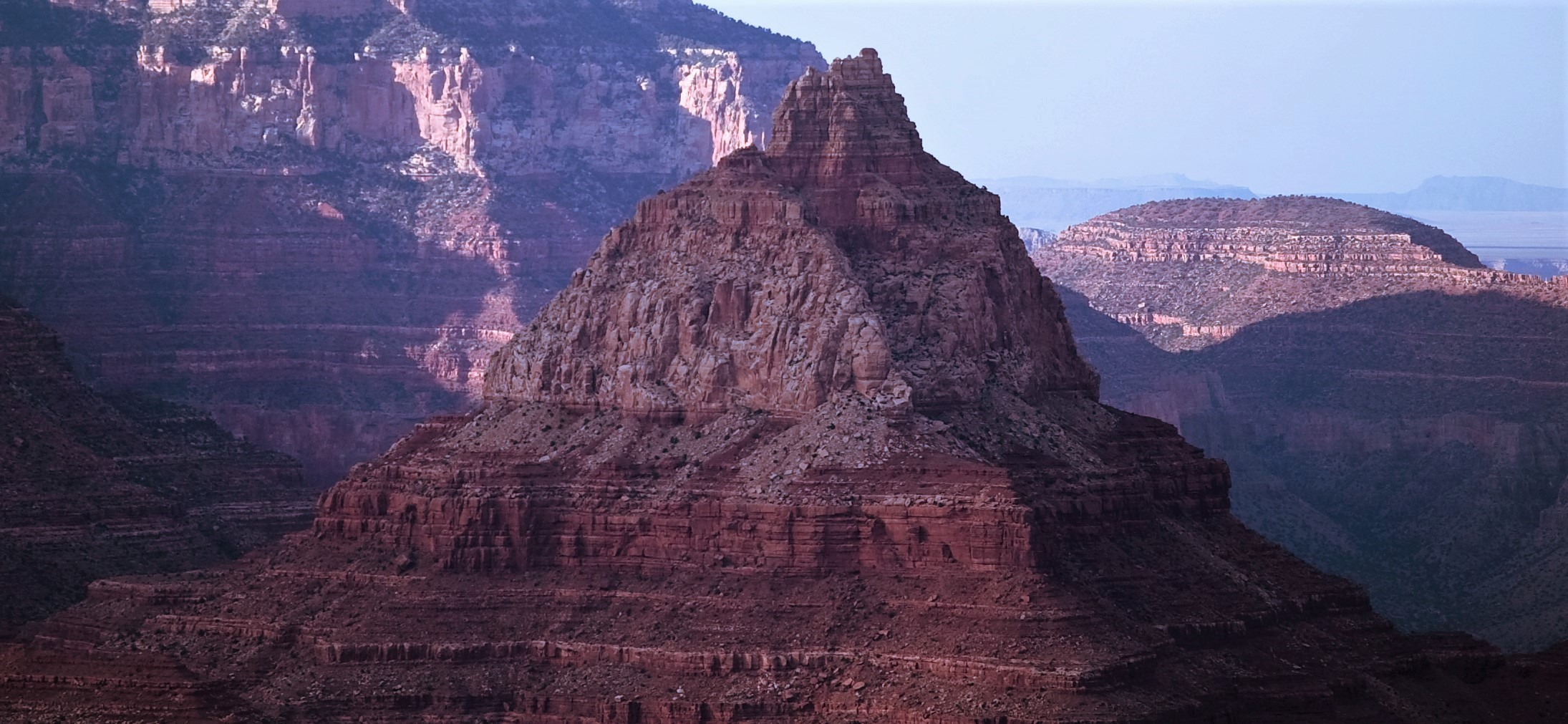
South aspect, summit detail

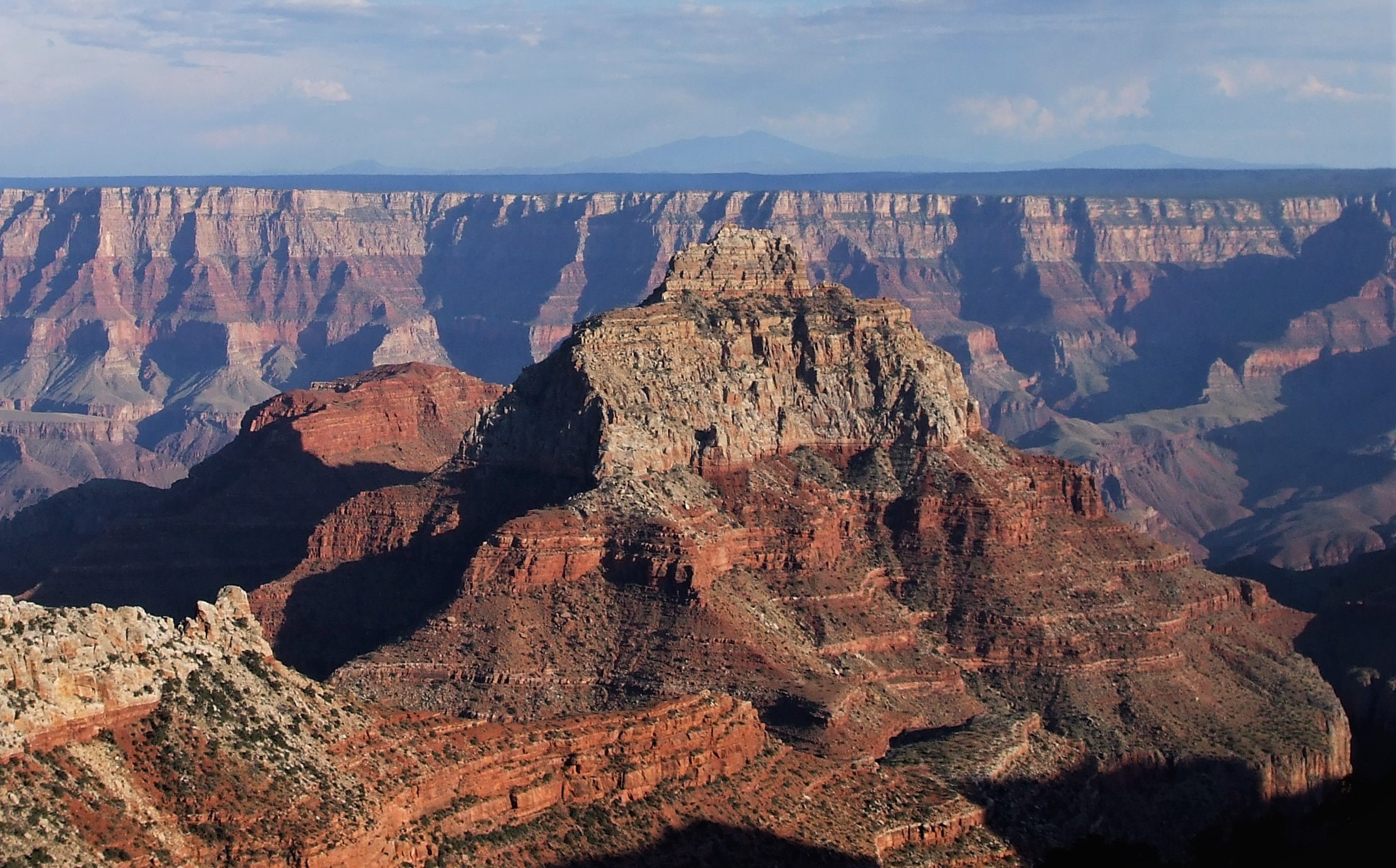
Coconino Sandstone overlain by Kaibab Limestone summit

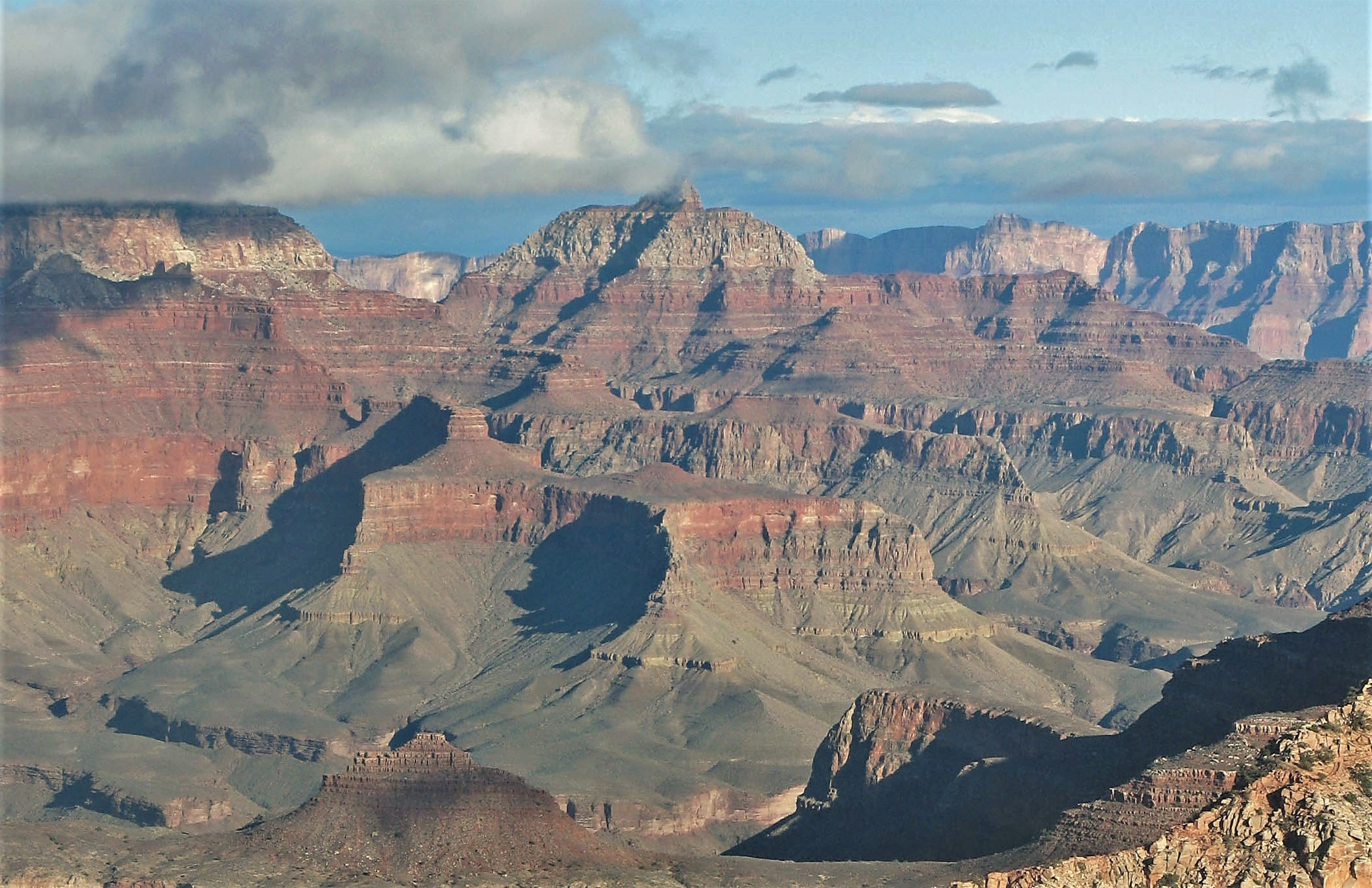
Vishnu Temple from Mather Point

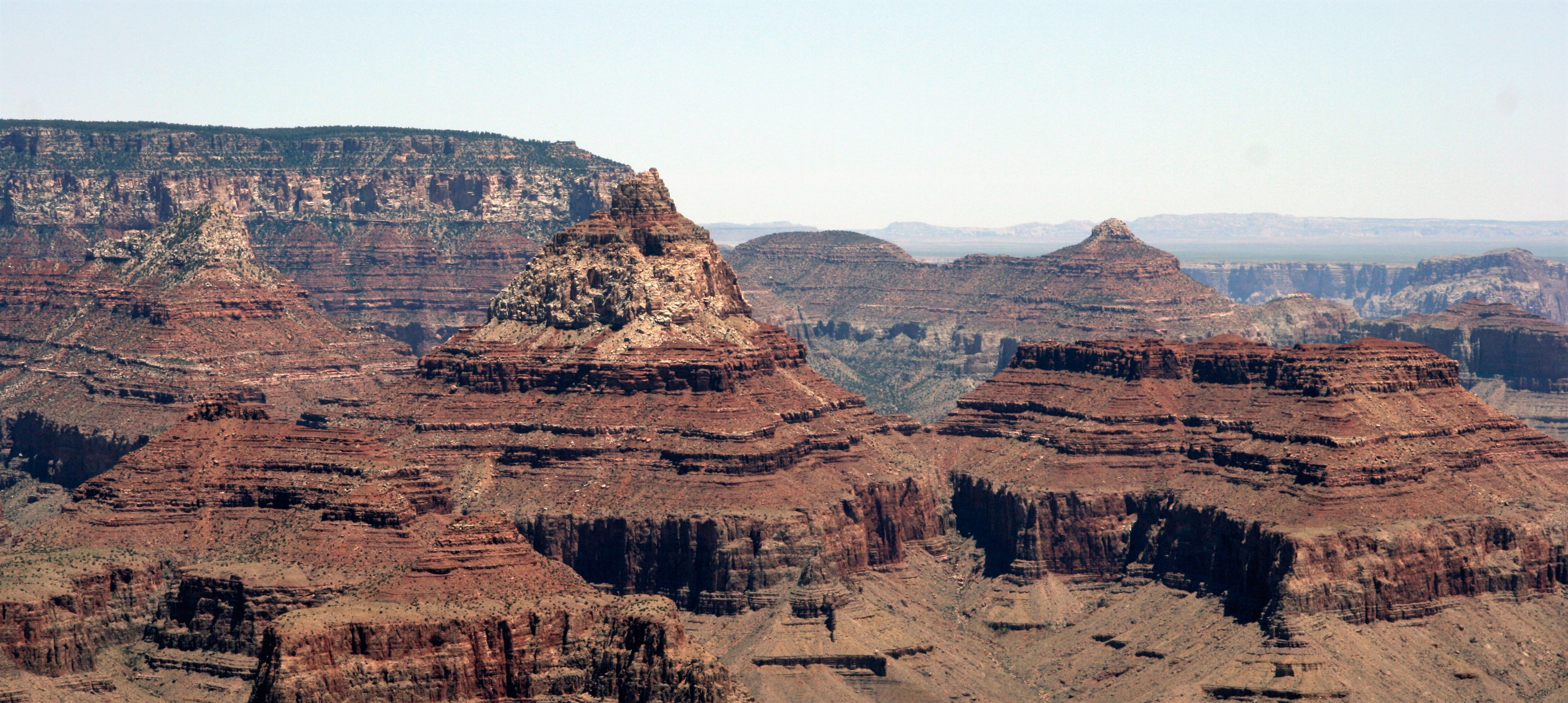
Krishna Shrine (lower left), Vishnu Temple, Rama Shrine (right)

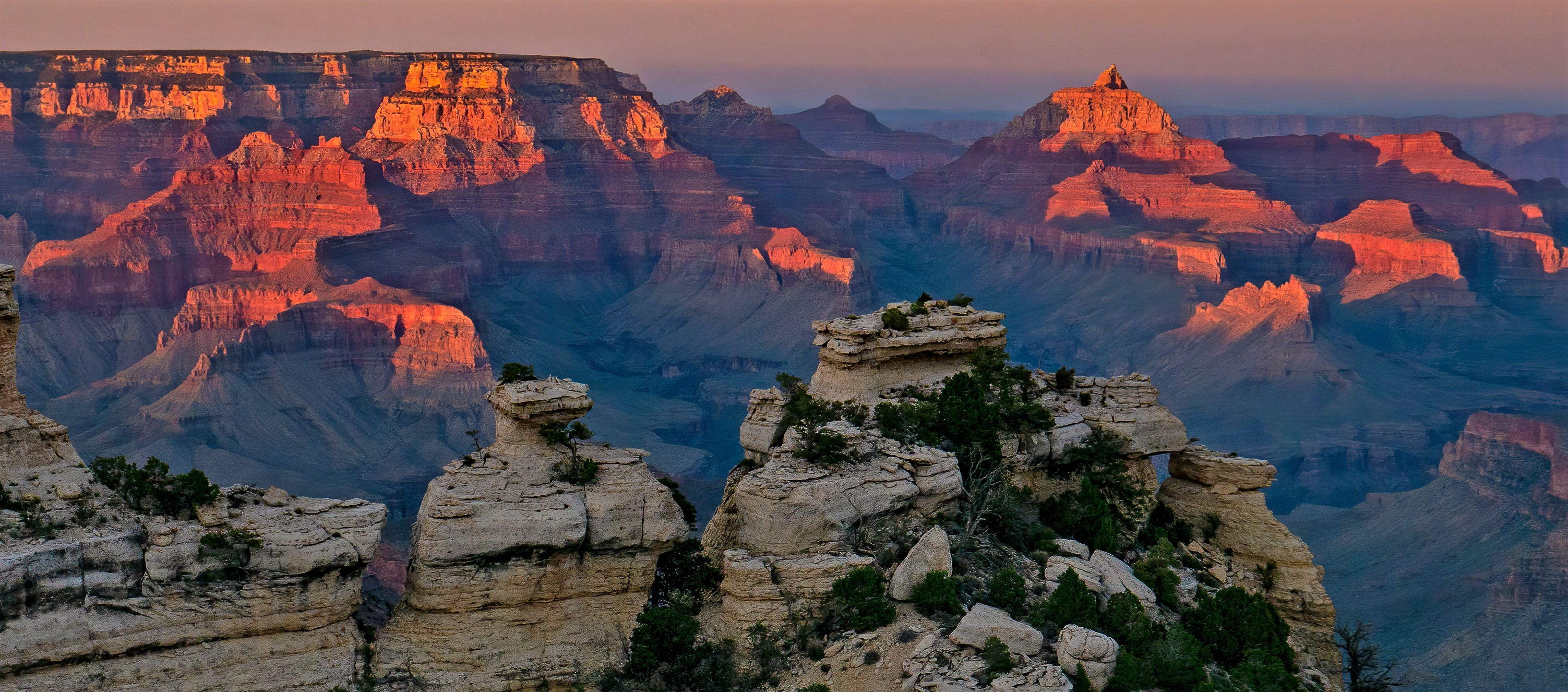
Vishnu Temple (right) at sunset

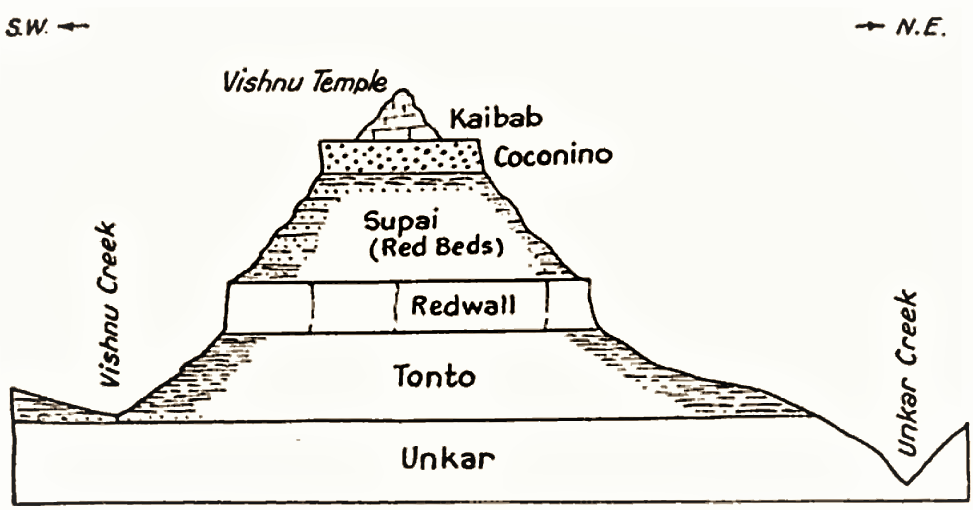

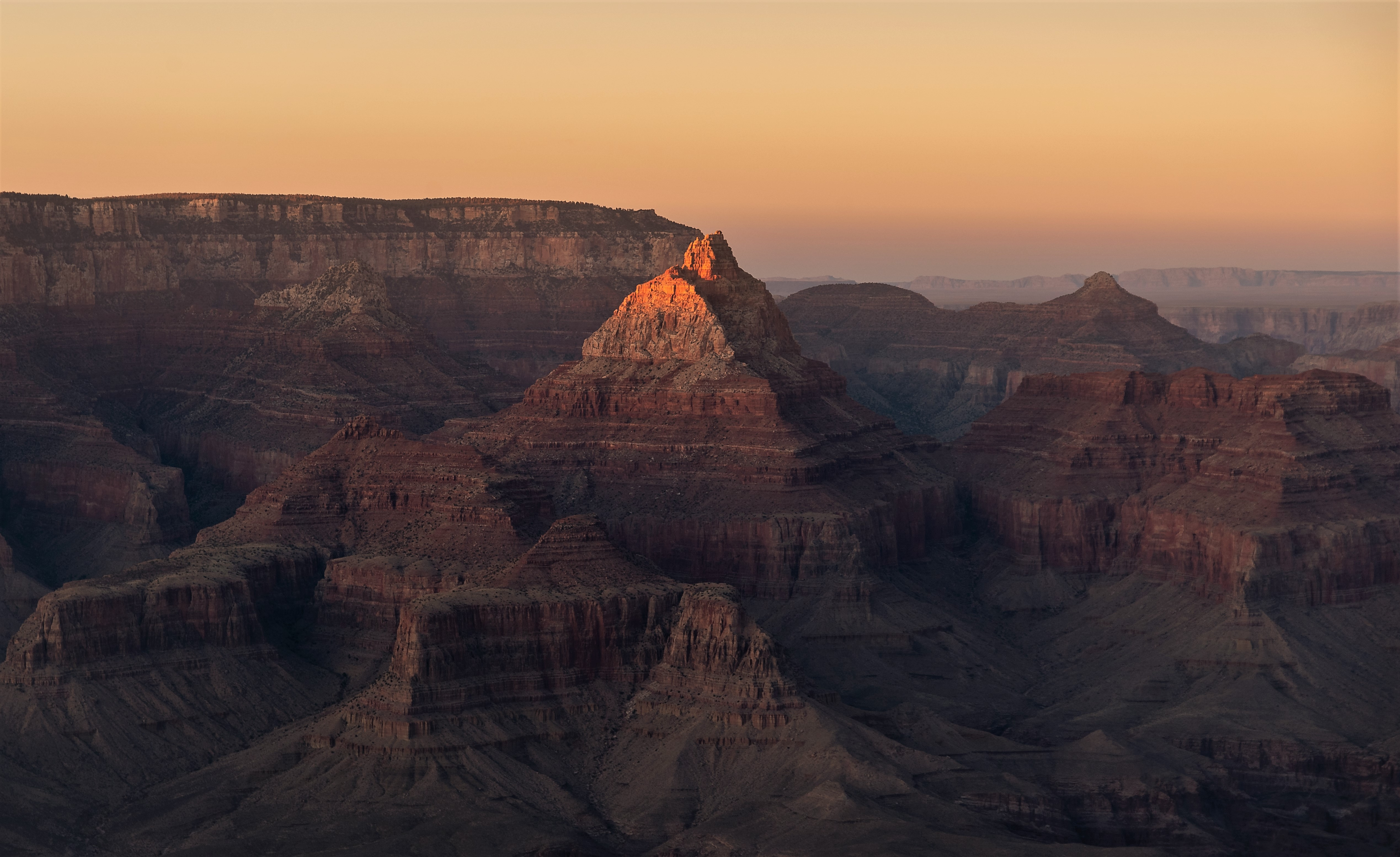
Last light on Vishnu Temple

== See also ==
- Geology of the Grand Canyon area
- Rama Shrine
