= Isis Temple =

Landform in the Grand Canyon, Arizona

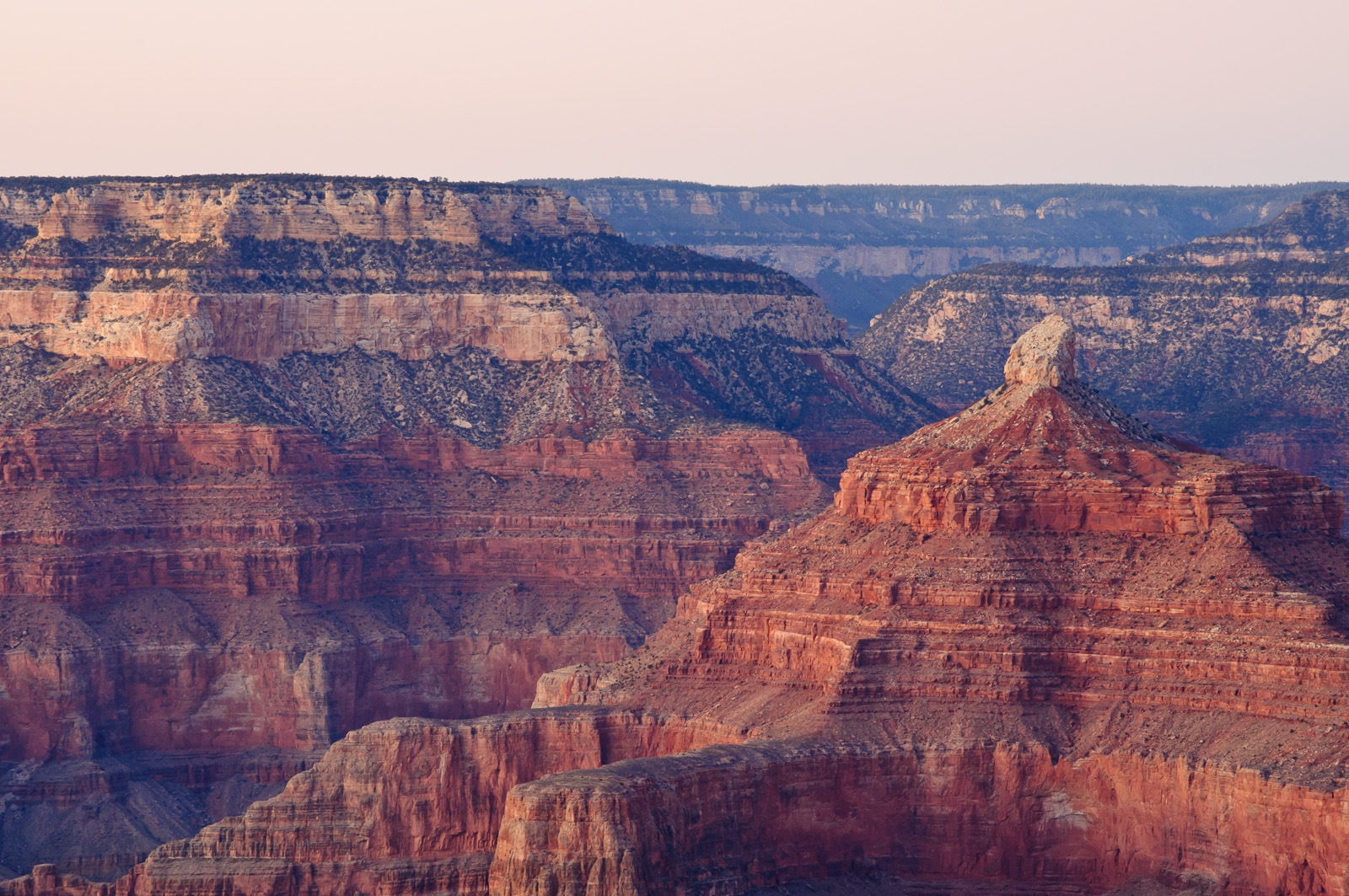
- Isis Temple is the landform on the right with the summit block (capstone). (Flat-topped & heavily forested Shiva Temple prominence to left)

Highest point
- Elevation: 7,006 ft (2,135 m) NGVD 29
- Prominence: 1,666 ft (508 m)
- Coordinates: 36°08′27″N 112°08′17″W

Naming
- Etymology: Isis

Geography
- Location within Arizona
- Location: Grand Canyon; Coconino County, Arizona. U.S.
- Topo map: USGS Shiva Temple

Geology
- Rock age: Permian down to Proterozoic
- Rock type(s): sedimentary, upon Unkar Group quartzite and sedimentary Coconino Sandstone-(prominence), Hermit Shale, Supai Group, Redwall Limestone, Muav Limestone; Temple Butte Formation; Tonto Group–(units 2,v3 of 3); 3_Muav Limestone, 2_Bright Angel Shale, Unkar Group-(units 1,2,3 of 5); 3_Shinumo Quartzite, 2_Hakatai Shale, 1_Bass Limestone, Vishnu Basement Rocks

Isis Temple is a prominence in the Grand Canyon, Arizona, Southwestern United States. It is located below the North Rim and adjacent to the Granite Gorge along the Colorado River. The Trinity Creek and canyon flow due south at its west border; its north, and northeast border/flank is formed by Phantom Creek (Phantom Ranch, about 2,460 ft (750 m)) and canyon, a west tributary of Bright Angel Creek; the creeks intersect about 3 mi (4.8 km) southeast, and 1.0 mi (1.6 km) north of Granite Gorge. The Isis Temple prominence (a short remainder caprock of bright-white Coconino Sandstone, on an erosion slope of brownish Hermit Formation), is only about 202 ft (62 m) lower than Grand Canyon Village, the main public center on Grand Canyon’s South Rim.

Isis Temple is about 5 mi (8.0 km) directly north of Grand Canyon Village on the South Rim, Grand Canyon; the Village is the west terminus of Arizona Route 64 (East Rim Drive), and north terminus of U.S. 180, from Valle, Arizona, and Williams (about 58 mi (93 km) south).

Isis Temple is part of an uplifted, and sub-faulted block (about 3.5 mi (5.6 km) long and 2.0 mi (3.2 km) wide), with a sub-peak landform, Cheops Pyramid 5,392 ft (1,643 m), about 1,600 ft (488 m) lower in elevation, and 1.0 mi (1.6 km) southeast of the Isis Temple prominence. The Isis prominence is composed of erosion resistant cliff-forming Coconino Sandstone.

== Trails ==
The North Kaibab Trail accesses the Bright Angel Canyon route. Views of Isis Temple, or routes to the region are from the middle, or lower Bright Angel Canyon-Phantom Creek region, the flatlands around Isis, Cheops and the block southeast, called Utah Flats; one of the trails leads to the viewpoint at the Isis-Cheops Saddle. From the North Rim, the Tiyo Point Trail has views of Isis Temple from the north.

== Geology ==
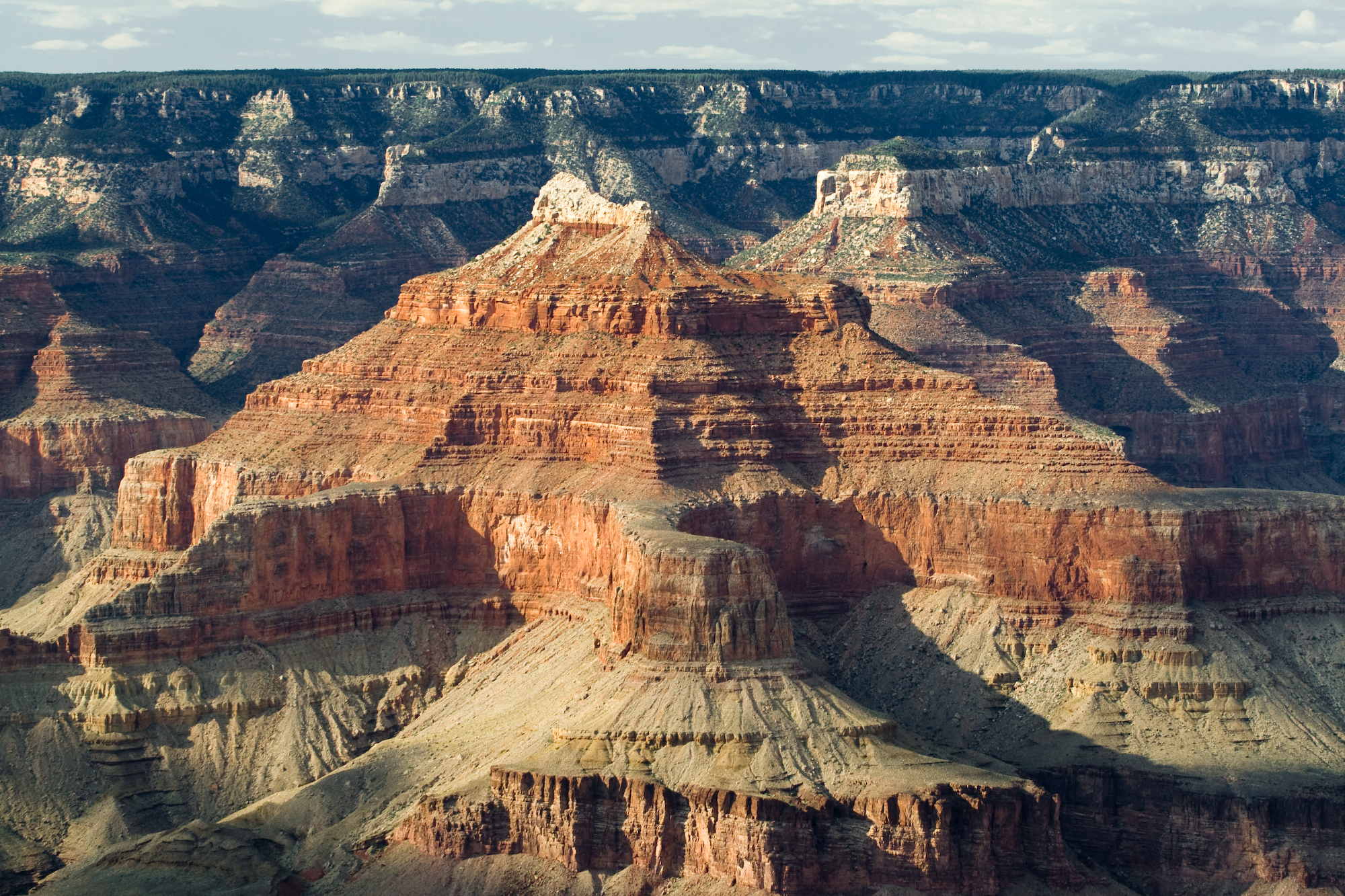
Isis Temple from 2-mi SSW. From Dana Butte region upon (west)-Tonto Trail, south Granite Gorge. Right of Isis peak is the southwest cliff of the ridgeline: The Colonnade, at Tiyo Point; behind Isis peak is Tiyo Point, North Rim, and the Kaibab-Toroweap-Coconino Sandstone cliff sequence-(white-dark-white), and forested top, about 5.5-mi from Dana Butte, Tonto Trail.

The prominence of Isis Temple is composed of the Coconino Sandstone, at 7,012 feet (2,137 m), (a similar elevation to the North Rim, Grand Canyon, Kaibab Plateau, and the Coconino is geologic member no. 2 of the 4 units of Permian age; unit 4, Kaibab Limestone makes up the Kaibab Plateau). Below the cliff-former Coconino Sandstone is eroded, slope-forming Hermit Shale, upon the uppermost Supai Group 'redbeds' member the cliff-forming, Esplanade Sandstone-(see Tuckup Trail). After the thick sequence of 'redbeds', the cliff-forming Redwall Limestone sits above highly eroded slopes of Muav Limestone and Bright Angel Shale. These slopes are deposited upon the cliff-forming unit of Shinumo Quartzite. The Shinumo Quartzite forms the cliff-base of Isis Temple, with highly erodable units forming the slopes below, the colorful, yellows, reds, and purplish colors from the Hakatai Shale, above the bottom Unkar Group member, Bass Formation-(in other photos shown as a well-bedded, grayish, multi-layered member, sitting on Vishnu Basement Rocks, at the top of Middle Granite Gorge).

The Shinumo Quartzite lies above the slope-forming unit of the Hakatai Shale, above Bass Formation. The two slope formers can be seen as reddish, yellowish, and purplish in photographs. From the south, three colorful slope-forming sections below the Shinumo Quartzite cliffs can be observed from a distance, one each below Isis Temple and Cheops Pyramid; a lower prominence has the third slope directly upon Granite Gorge, with the intersection of Bright Angel Creek/Canyon, located at the southeast section of the uplifted fault-block, that Isis Temple and Cheops Pyramid are part of.

=== Tapeats Sea, Shinumo Quartzite, and Unkar Group Horst ===
No Tapeats Sandstone was deposited upon the Shinumo Quartzite. In the Tapeats Sea, the marine transgression sequence of sandstone-(conglomerates)-shale-limestone found two 'mountain island' members, the Cardenas Basalt (sections), and the Shinumo Quartzite, as erosion resistant 'prominences'. Only the Bright Angel Shale and Muav Limestone were deposited above the 'mountain island' prominences; Tapeats Sandstone was deposited around the 'Shinumo Quartzite island' perimeter, and can be seen in Bright Angel Canyon, west and northwest, the Phantom Creek drainage, north, and in the Trinity Creek drainage down the west perimeter, and upstream.

The Isis Temple-Cheops Pyramid is part of a localized fault-block, uplifted; (it also contains 3 sub-faults within it, parallel to the fault at its north border, Phantom Creek); the fault bordering the fault-block west, is down Trinity Creek; the fault east is the Bright Angel Fault, down Bright Angel Canyon, and on the south (South Rim side, 'south' of Middle Granite Gorge), through Garden Creek (canyon), of the Bright Angel Trail.

The Unkar Group, which forms the base of Isis Temple, consists of the Shinumo Quartzite, Hakatai Shale, and Bass Formation in descending order. The Unkar Group lies upon the Vishnu Basement Rocks, which are exposed in Lower, Middle, and Upper Granite Gorge. The Unkar Group, and other subdivisions of the (Grand Canyon Supergroup), are tilted, about 15 degrees, as seen in photographs, or while viewing in Grand Canyon.

== List of geologic units of Isis Temple ==
The following is the list of geologic units below the Isis Temple prominence (for 5-member Unkar Group fault–block, members 3 through 1):

- Coconino Sandstone, (prominence, Permian unit 3 of 5 in Grand Canyon)
- Hermit Shale, Permian
- Supai Group, (4 units, Pennsylvanian–Permian)
  - 4 – Esplanade Sandstone, (Permian)
    (Typically forms a resistant (& thick) cliff, thickening in Western Grand Canyon)
  - 3 – Wescogame Formation
  - 2 – Manakacha Formation
  - 1 – Watahomigi Formation
- (no Surprise Canyon Formation)
- Redwall Limestone
- Temple Butte Formation
- Muav Limestone, (Tonto Group, unit 3 of 3)
- Bright Angel Shale, (Tonto Group, unit 2 of 3)
- 3 – Shinumo Quartzite-(Unkar Group, 1–3 of 5)
- 2 – Hakatai Shale
- 1 – Bass Formation
- Vishnu Basement Rocks

== Trinity Canyon/Trinity Creek landforms ==
The headwaters of Trinity Canyon lies at the south face of Shiva Temple (Grand Canyon). The eastern watershed north to south is Isis Temple with two side canyons of the western extension arms of the Isis Temple. The western watershed north to south is the Claude Birdseye Point prominence on a western arm of Shiva Temple (Arizona). Next is a series of three connected landforms, lowering in height southward – Osiris Temple (ht 6613 ft), Horus Temple (ht 6150 ft), and Tower of Set (ht 6012 ft), bordering the outfall region into Granite Gorge and the Colorado River.

== Observation viewpoints ==
Isis Temple can be viewed from the South Rim, from the viewpoints, west and east of Grand Canyon Village, Arizona. Hopi Point (west), and Yavapai Point (east), and Mather Point, are both at Grand Canyon Village, and due-south of Isis Temple.

Isis Temple can be viewed from the North Rim, Bright Angel Point region; Isis Temple prominence is about 3-mi due south of Tiyo Point-(Tiyo Point Trail), and Isis and Cheops Pyramid are about 5-mi southwest of Bright Angel Point.

== Additional sources ==
- Arizona Road & Recreation Atlas, Benchmark Maps, 2nd Edition, 1998, 112 pages, pp. 28–29, 62–63.
- Arizona DeLorme Atlas & Gazetteer, 5th Edition, 2002, 76 pages, pp. 31, 23.
- Chronic, Halka. Roadside Geology of Arizona, 1983, 23rd printing, Mountain Press Publishing Co. 322 pages. pp. 229–32 (US 89A Marble Canyon – Fredonia), pp. 179–180. (softcover, ISBN 978-0878421473)
- Lucchitta, 2001. Hiking Arizona's Geology, Ivo Lucchitta, 2001, Mountaineers's Books. (softcover, ISBN 0898867304)
