= Mather Point =

Landform in the Grand Canyon, Arizona

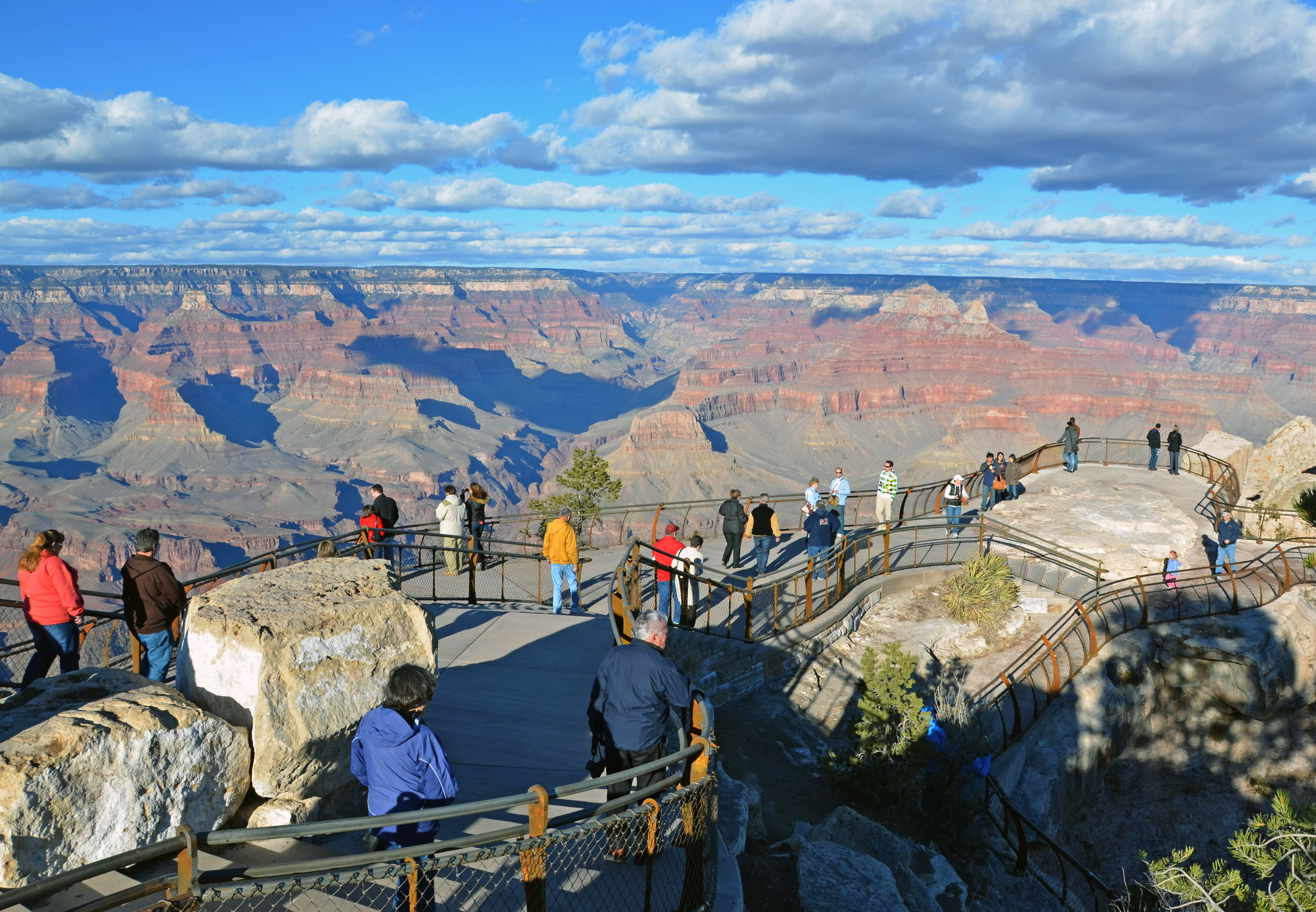

Highest point
- Elevation: 7,119 ft (2,170 m)
- Prominence: 450 ft (140 m)
- Parent peak: Yaki Point (7,260 ft)
- Isolation: 1.5 mi (2.4 km)
- Coordinates: 36.0616497°N 112.1079463°W

Naming
- Etymology: Stephen Tyng Mather

Geography
- Location within Arizona Location within the United States
- Location: Grand Canyon National Park, Coconino County, Arizona, US
- Parent range: Kaibab Plateau; Coconino Plateau
- Topo map: USGS Phantom Ranch

Geology
- Rock age: Permian down to Cambrian
- Mountain type(s): sedimentary rock: limestone-(prominence-cliff), mudstone, siltstone, sandstone
- Rock type(s): Kaibab Limestone-(prominence), Toroweap Formation, Coconino Sandstone, Hermit Shale, Supai Group, Redwall Limestone; Tonto Group

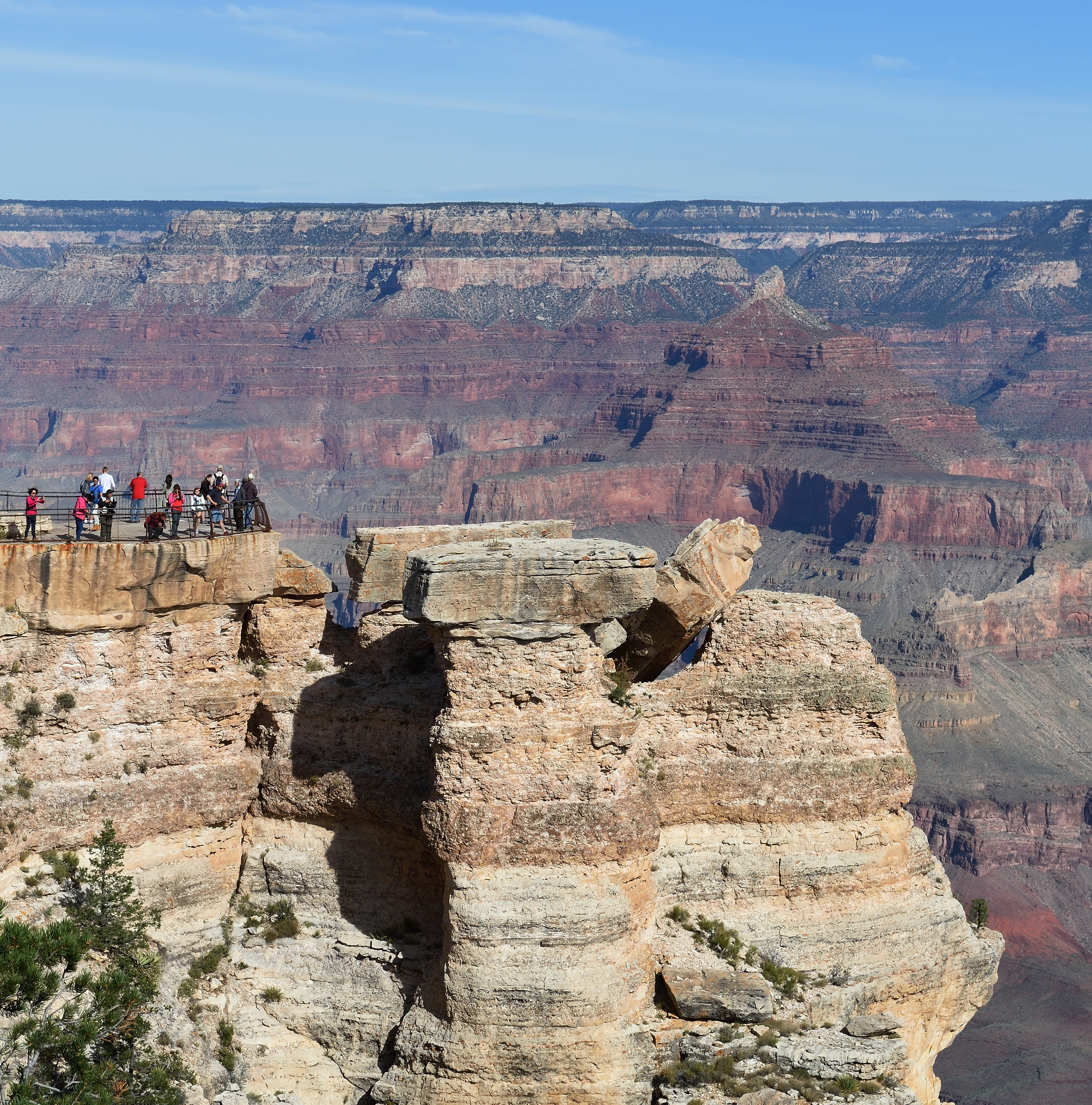
East view of Mather Point

Mather Point is a 7,119 foot (2,170 m)-cliff-elevation Point located in the central Grand Canyon, Coconino County of northern Arizona, United States. It was named in honor of Stephen Tyng Mather, an American industrialist and conservationist.

It is located about 2.0 miles east-northeast of Grand Canyon Village on the South Rim. It is about 0.75 miles east of Yavapai Point, its closest scenic viewpoint neighbor, and it lies about 1.5 miles west of Yaki Point, across Upper Pipe Creek Canyon. Pipe Creek enters Lower Garden Creek, and the Bright Angel Trail descends there to cross the Colorado River and go up Bright Angel Canyon. The viewpoints of Mather Point, (and Yavapai Point), look northwards (across Granite Gorge), up Bright Angel Canyon, and view the prominences that align it, especially the nearest of Isis Temple and Cheops Pyramid, and on the east, Zoroaster Temple, with Demaray Point, Bradley Point, and Sumner Butte.

Mather Point is about 1.0 mi north of Arizona Rt 64, South Rim Drive, the access road along the South Rim. The Rim Trail of the South Rim traverses through the major points of the South Rim, including Mather Point.

Mather Point is composed of horizontally layered cliff-former Kaibab Limestone, and is mostly buff, or tan-white. The rock at the point is distinctive with its limestone erosion-holes, and is broken into large blocks. Mather Point is also composed of Kaibab upon Toroweap Formation slopes, upon white cliffs of Coconino Sandstone.
