= Bass Formation =

Lithostratigraphic unit found in Arizona, US

Coordinates: 36.1080°N 112.1209°W

- Stratigraphic range: Mesoproterozoic, 1250 Ma
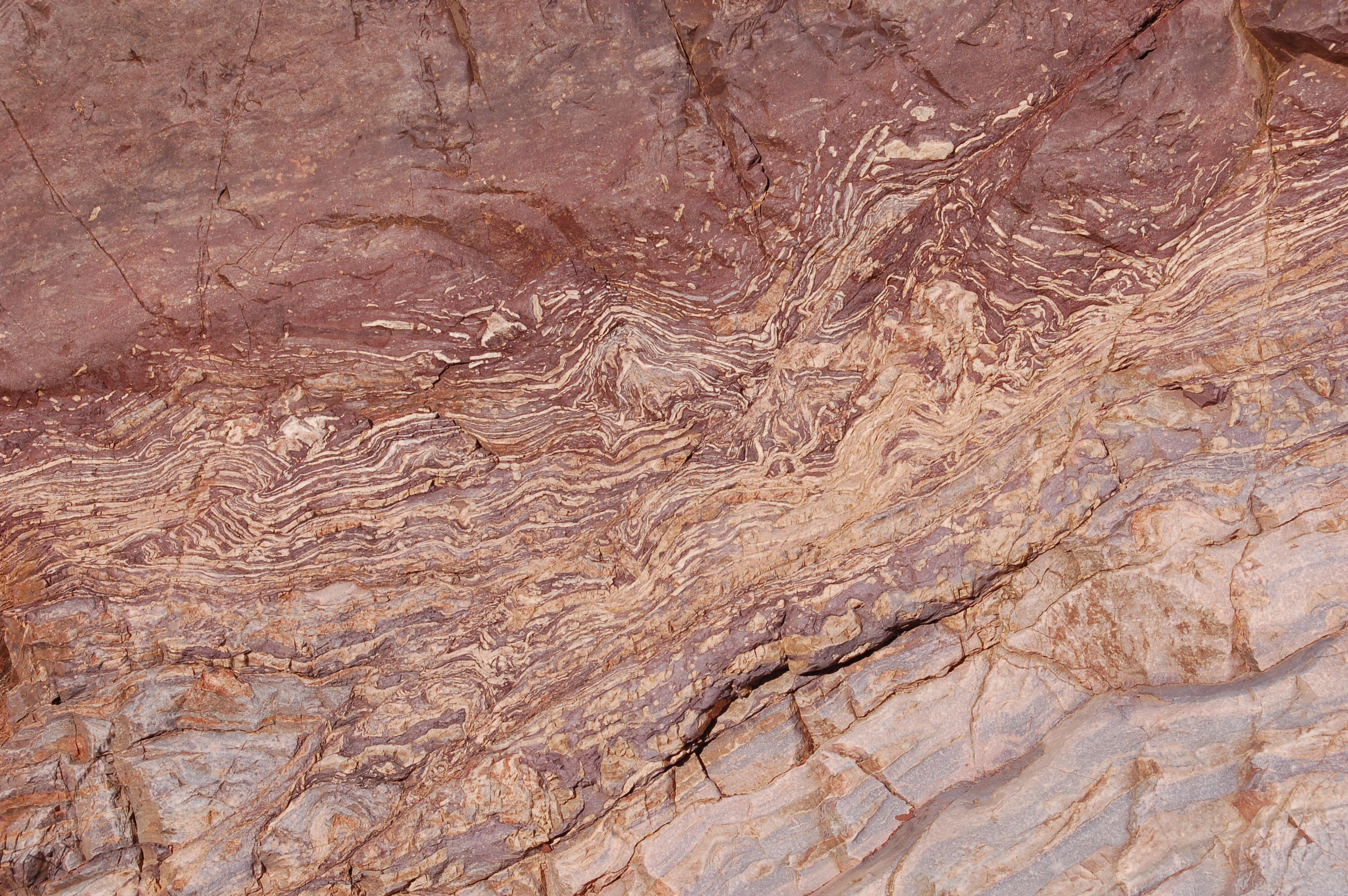
- Stromatolites in Bass Limestone, Grand Canyon
- Type: Geological formation
- Unit of: Unkar Group
- Sub-units: Hotauta Member
- Underlies: Hakatai Shale
- Overlies: Vishnu Basement Rocks on major erosion unconformity
- Thickness: 121 to 341 feet (37 to 104 m)

Lithology
- Primary: dolomite
- Other: sandstone, conglomerate, argillite, and limestone

Location
- Region: Grand Canyon
- Country: United States

Type section
- Named for: Bass Canyon
- Named by: Noble (1914)

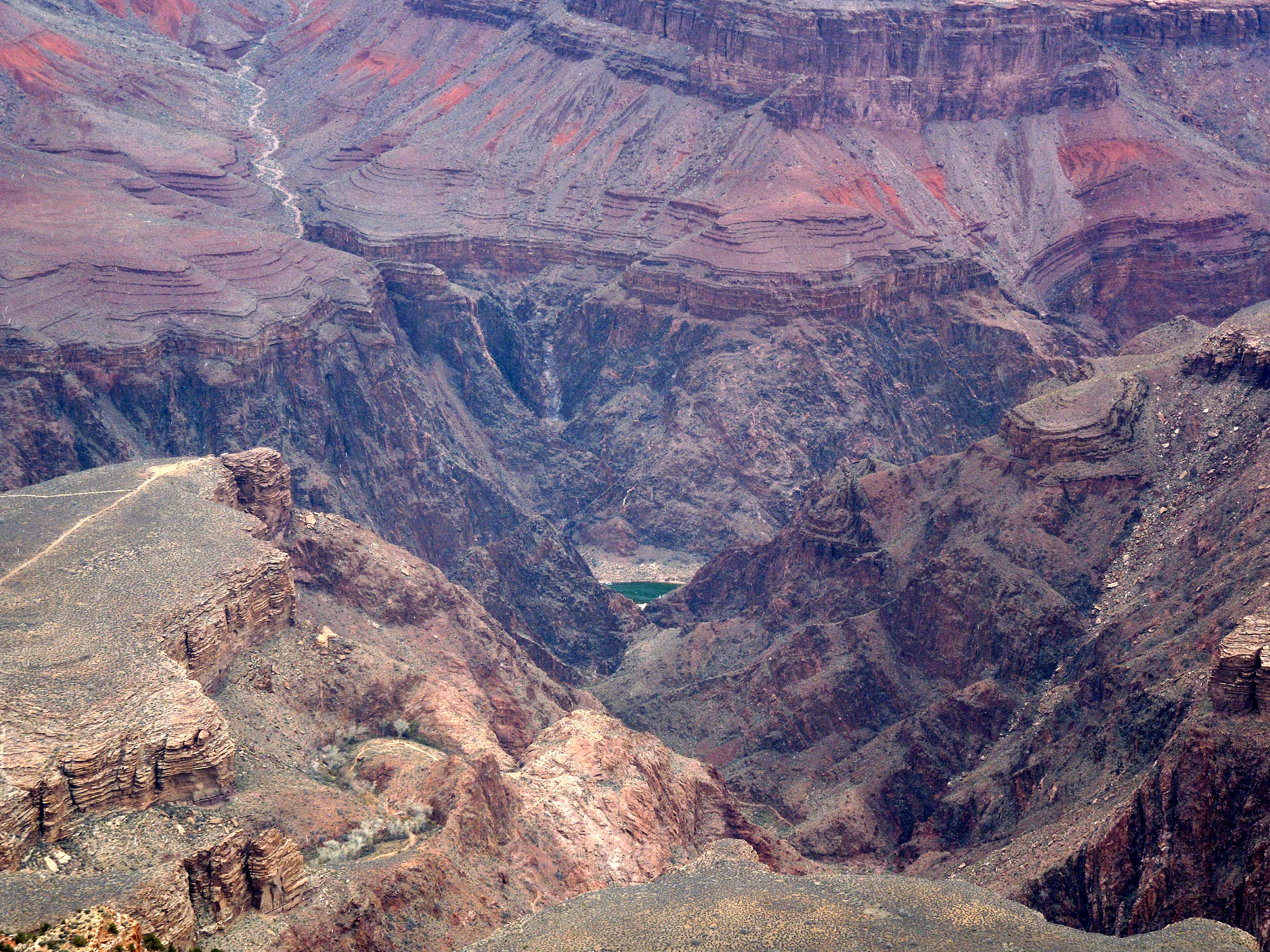
Bass Formation (multiple & thinly layered) below colorful Hakatai Shale-(orange), sitting on Granite Gorge-(Upper Inner Gorge, the blackish Vishnu Basement Rocks). Cheops Pyramid (prominence), Grand Canyon (Isis Temple region, Bright Angel Canyon)

The Bass Formation, also known as the Bass Limestone, is a Mesoproterozoic rock formation that outcrops in the eastern Grand Canyon, Coconino County, Arizona. The Bass Formation erodes as either cliffs or stair-stepped cliffs. In the case of the stair-stepped topography, resistant dolomite layers form risers and argillite layers form steep treads. In general, the Bass Formation in the Grand Canyon region and associated strata of the Unkar Group-rocks dip northeast (10°–30°) toward normal faults that dip 60+° toward the southwest. This can be seen at the Palisades fault in the eastern part of the main Unkar Group outcrop area (below East Rim). In addition, thick, prominent, and dark-colored basaltic sills intrude across the Bass Formation.

The Bass Formation is the basal part of the Unkar Group.

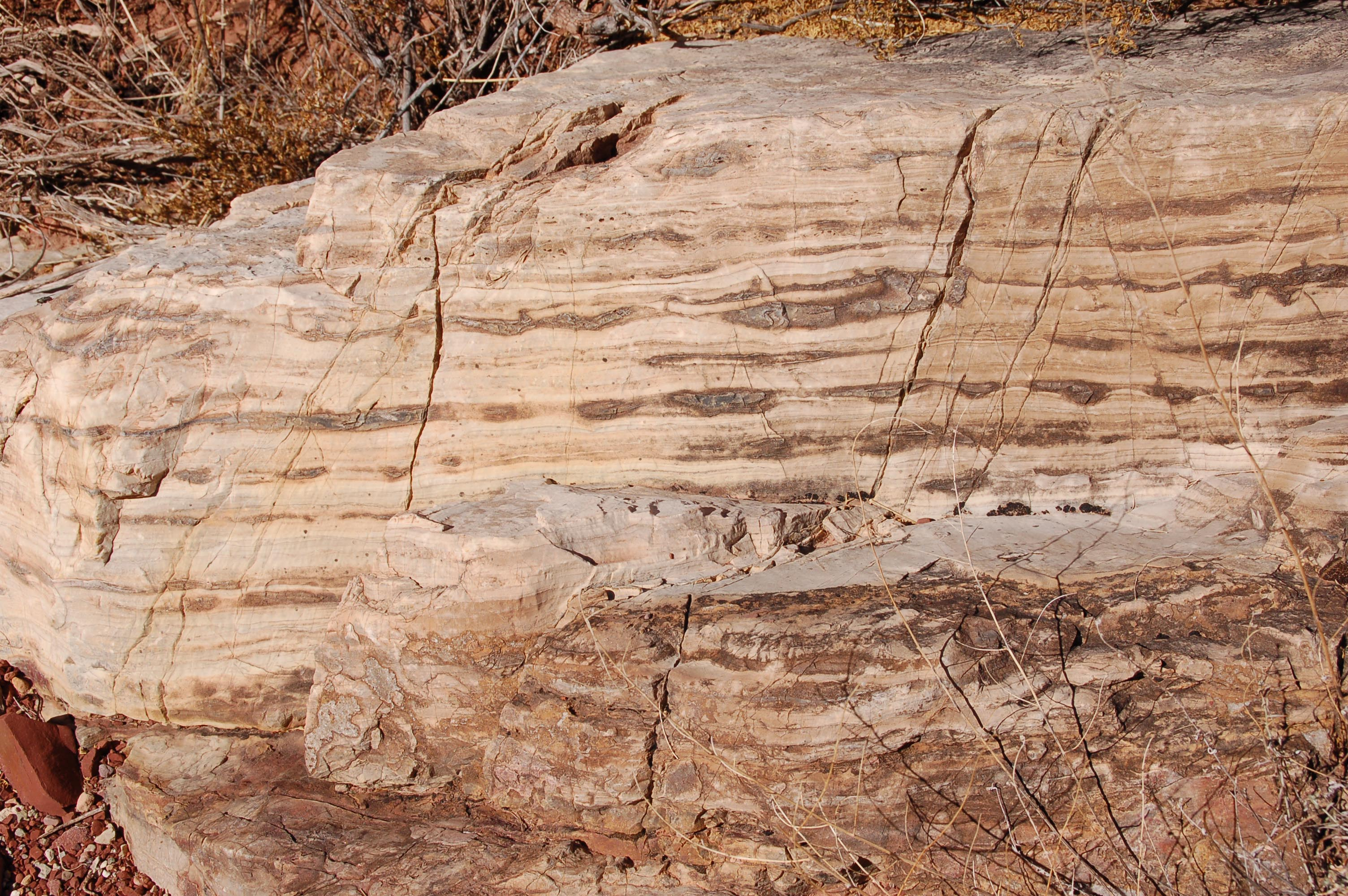
Close-up showing a light rock color, but the multiple layers of bedding in the Bass Formation.

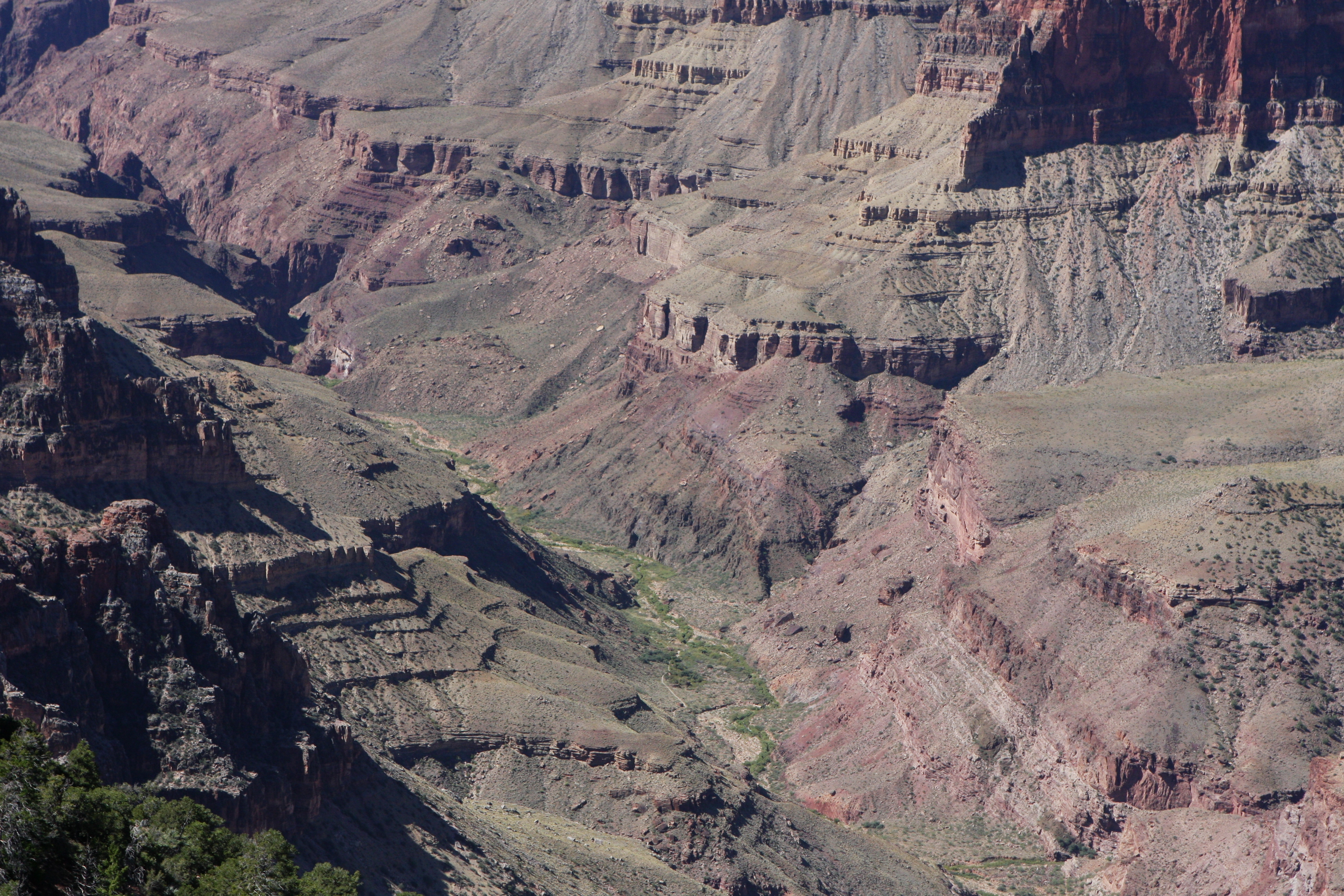
From Komo Point / Komo Point Trail, a few sections near Granite Gorge of black Vishnu Basement Rocks and a section of the layered Bass Limestone (note horizontal layering & dk blackish-brown color) – visible below the cliffs of Tapeats Sandstone. (high resolution expandable photo)

The Unkar Group is about 1,600 to 2,200 m (5,200 to 7,200 ft) thick and composed of, in ascending order, the Bass Formation, Hakatai Shale, Shinumo Quartzite, Dox Formation, and Cardenas Basalt. The Unkar Group is overlain in ascending order by the Nankoweap Formation, about 113 to 150 m (371 to 492 ft) thick; the Chuar Group, about 1,900 m (6,200 ft) thick; and the Sixtymile Formation, about 60 m (200 ft) thick.

The Grand Canyon Supergroup, of which the Bass Formation is the lowermost formation, overlies deeply eroded granites, gneisses, pegmatites, and schists that comprise Vishnu Basement Rocks.

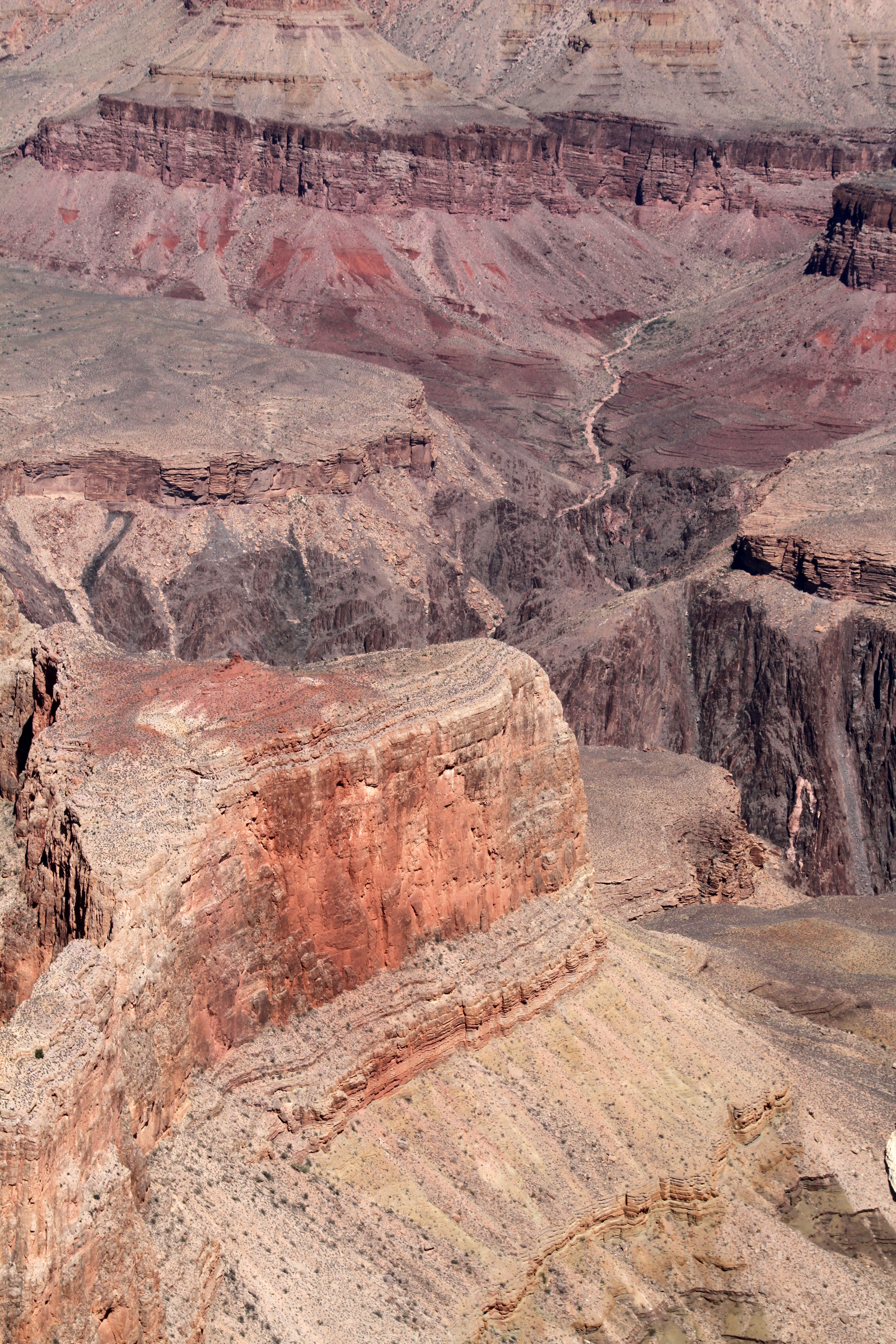
Multiple bedding layers in dk brown Bass Formation, below colorful Hakatai Shale.

There has been some discussion about the nomenclature of the Bass Formation. It was originally named the Bass Limestone in 1914 for Bass Canyon, where it is typically exposed. The Bass Limestone has been reclassified as the Bass Formation by geologists because it consists of heterogeneous mixtures of clastic and carbonate sedimentary strata of which dolomite is the predominant rock type and limestone is only a minor rock type. In addition, its Hotauta Member was originally designated as the Hotauta Conglomerate in 1914 as a separate unit of formation status for Hotauta Canyon. It was later included in the Bass Formation as a member where it has remained.

== Description ==
The Bass Formation consists of interbedded sandstone (arkose), and silty sandstone, prominent interbeds of conglomerate and dolomite, and subordinate interbeds of argillite and limestone. Dolomite and sandy dolomite are the predominant lithologies. Beds of intraformational breccia are also found throughout the Bass Formation. The dolomites and limestones vary in color from gray to red-gray and sometimes contain biscuit-form and biohermal stromatolite beds. The conglomerates, breccias, sandstones, and argillites vary in color from purple-brown to dark red and reddish brown.

Dolomite and limestone dominate the Bass Formation in the central part of the Grand Canyon, while the sandstone, conglomerate, and argillite dominate the Bass Formation in the eastern part of the Grand Canyon. The Bass Formation typically becomes generally finer grained toward the top.

Volcanic ash layers occur in the Bass Formation. They consist of layers of white, very fine-grained tephra, that are interbedded with dolomite and argillite toward the base of the formation. These layers are characterized by sharp basal contacts, some graded-bedding, and a diverse silicate mineral assemblage that differs from the carbonate or calcsilicate dominated mineral assemblages of adjacent strata. Zircons from one of these volcanic ash beds has been dated using Uranium-lead dating techniques.

The base of both the Bass Formation and Unkar Group in eastern Grand Canyon is marked by the Hotauta Member of the Bass Formation. It is a prominent discontinuous, conglomerate, initially named the Hotauta Conglomerate and later redesignated the Hotauta Member. This conglomerate consists of rounded, pebble to cobble-sized clasts of chert, granite, quartz, plagioclase crystals, and micropegmatites in a quartz sand matrix. About 80% of the gravel-size clasts consist of granite and quartzite. The quartzite gravel lacks any local equivalents in the Grand Canyon, indicating a distant source. Excellent exposures of the Hotauta Member occur at the Colorado River level near Hance Rapids (river mile 77) and along the South Kaibab and North Kaibab Trails.

A variety of sedimentary structures have been reported from the Bass Formation. They include ripple marks; mudcrack covered surfaces; cone-in-cone structures; interformational breccias/conglomerates; both normal and reversed small-scale, graded bedding; and local channel fills. The dolomite and limestone within the Bass formation have been affected by post-depositional alteration including: dolomitization, recrystallization, stylolitization, and silicification.

Basaltic sills and dikes intrude all strata of the Unkar Group that underlie the Cardenas Lava. Only sills, whose feeder dikes are not exposed, can be observed intruding the Bass Formation. Where the sills have intruded siliceous dolomites in the Bass Formation, metasomatism and recrystallization have produced chrysotile asbestos, both above and below the sills. Veins of asbestos with fibers up to 10 cm (3.9 in) in length, often commonly occur within 3 m (9.8 ft) of the upper and lower contacts of the sills.

The Bass Limestone shows generally, an increase in thickness to the northwest ranging from 37 (121 ft) to 104 m (341 ft) thick. Its average thickness is 80 m (260 ft). It is 100 m (330 ft) thick at Phantom Creek (north side of Isis Temple, Cheops Pyramid, & Utah Flats), and 57 m (187 ft) thick at Crystal Creek. The thin section of Bass Formation at Crystal Creek likely reflects the presence of a Vishnu Basement Rocks topographic high in the paleosurface on which it accumulated.

== Contacts ==
The base of the Bass Formation is a major unconformity that also forms the base of the Grand Canyon Supergroup and the Unkar Group. This unconformity separates the underlying and deeply eroded crystalline basement, which consists of granites, gneisses, pegmatites, and schists of the Vishnu Basement Rocks, from stratified Proterozoic rocks of the Grand Canyon Supergroup.

This contact is a remarkably smooth surface that has a relief of about 6 m (20 ft) in the Shinumo 15-minute topographic quadrangle and 15 m (49 ft) in the Bright Angel and Vishnu 15-minute topographic quadrangles. In Hotauta Canyon, and at Granite Narrows, this surface is extremely smooth with a relief of only a few meters. The greatest relief on this surface can be seen opposite the mouth of Shinumo Creek where low rounded hills of Vishnu Basement Rocks rise 6 m (20 ft) above the general level of a relatively flat surface.

The Vishnu Basement Rocks underlying this surface are often deeply weathered to an average depth of 3 m (9.8 ft) below it. Where it has not been removed by erosion, prior to, and during the deposition of the overlying Bass Formation, a residual regolith developed by subaerial weathering of the underlying basement rocks – is present. Typically, this regolith consists of a dark-reddish brown, structureless, ferruginous sediment that is usually a few centimeters to 30 cm (0.98 ft) thick. This contact is regarded as a classic example of an ancient peneplain.

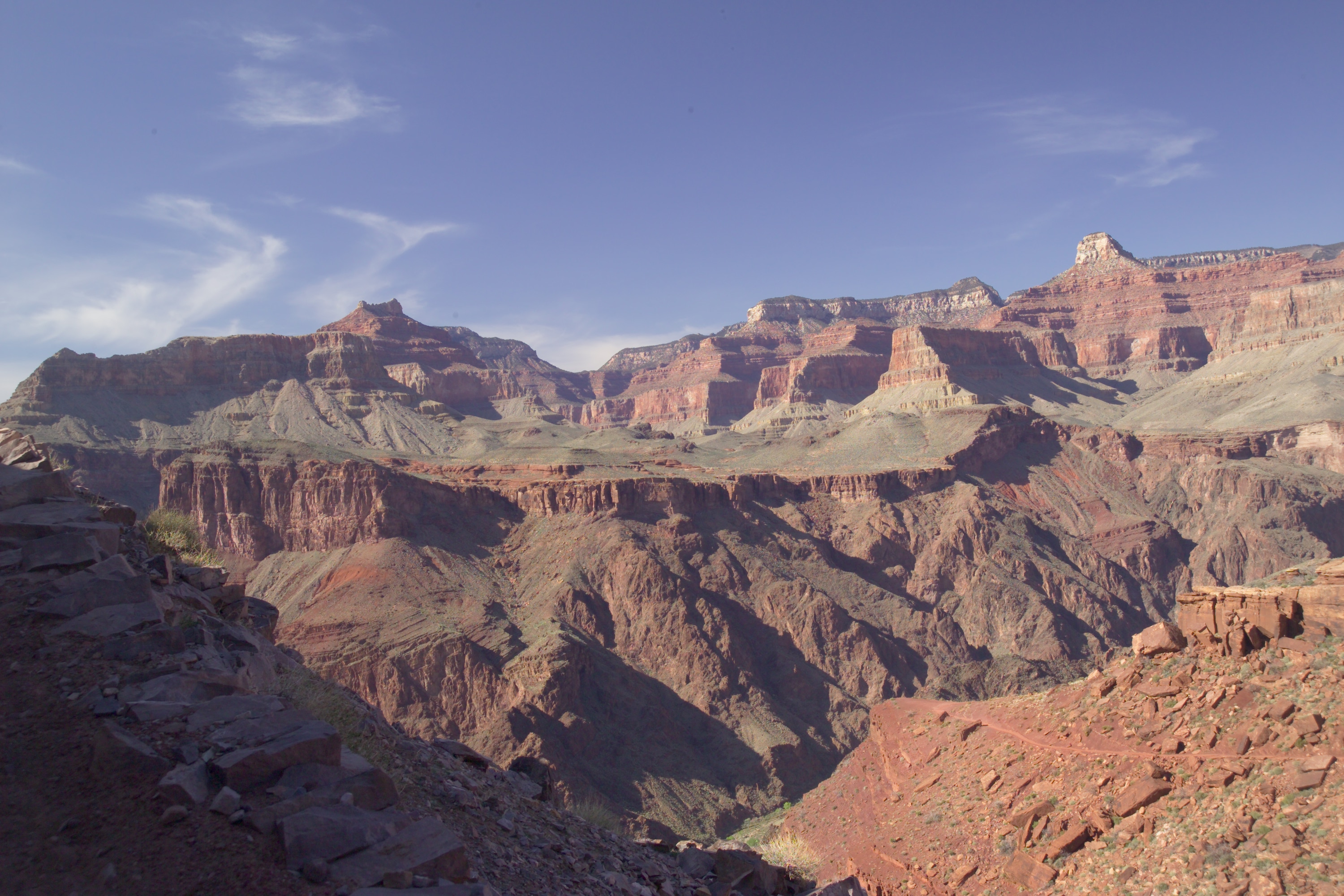
Bass Formation sitting on Granite Gorge. Isis Temple-Cheops Pyramid region (Utah Flats), with Shinumo Quartzite cliffs above orange-red Hakatai Shale, upon Bass Formation.

In the eastern part of the Grand Canyon, the contact between the Bass Formation and the overlying Hatakai Shale is typically gradational over an interval of a meter or so. For example, in Red Canyon, the contact consists of an interval in which stromatolitic limestone of the Bass Formation is intimately interbedded with coarse clastic sedimentary rock of the overlying Hakatai Shale. In the eastern part of the Grand Canyon, the contact is sharp, but conformable.

The contact between the Tapeats Sandstone and Bass Formation and the rest of the folded and faulted Unkar Group is a prominent angular unconformity, which is part of the Great Unconformity. The differential erosion of the Unkar Group left resistant beds of the Cardenas Basalt and Shinumo Quartzite as topographic highs, (today seen as ancient & weathered monadnocks), that are now buried by sandstones, shales, and conglomerates of the Tapeats Sandstone. These monadnocks served locally as sources of coarse-grained sediments during the marine transgression that deposited the Tapeats Sandstone and other members of the Tonto Group. The contact between the Bass Formation and the Tapeats Sandstone forms part of a relative flat surface that lies between the monadnocks.

== Fossils ==
Fossil stromatolites occur within the Bass Formation. Diagnostic “columnar forms” of stromatolites are uncommon. Of these forms, only Collenia undosa Walcott, Collenia symmetrica Fenton & Fenton, and Collenia frequens Walcott, have been reported from the Bass Formation so far. The environment, in which these stromatolites grew, as judged by the associated sediments, was one of quiet, shallow marine waters. The common presence of ripple-marks and mud-cracks suggest intermittent desiccation. Thin layers of flake-breccia associated with them indicate occasional periods of turbulence of brief duration. However, direct evidence specifically indicating an intertidal environment close to a shoreline is lacking.

Various types of other fossils, i.e. jellyfish, sponges, worm trails, and bivalves have been reported from the Bass Formation. Critical examinations of these reported fossils have concluded that the fossil sponges are inorganic silica concretions; the jellyfish are either gas escape structures or algal colonies; and the worm trails are inorganic sedimentary structures. In addition, fossils of a bivalve of unknown affinity, which were reported from the Bass Formation, are now judged to be rounded mud-flakes or pellets that are likely oncolites of algal origin.

== Depositional environments ==
The lithology and sedimentary structures observed in the Bass Limestone indicate that, except for the Hotauta Member, it accumulated beneath a sea that transgressed from the west. The Hotauta Member consists of fluvial sands and gravels that accumulated within valleys on an eroded surface of the Vishnu Basement Rocks. The quartzite gravel indicates that the conglomerates of the Hotauta Member were deposited by river systems that extended some unknown distance outside of the Grand Canyon region. Marine sediments buried the fluvial deposits of the Hotauta Member as a smooth surface, with a local relief of probably no more than 150 feet (46 m) of the Vishnu Basement Rocks, being submerged by a marine transgression from the west. The dolomite of the Bass Formation likely was originally deposited as limestone and subsequently altered to dolomite by later diagenesis. This limestone largely accumulated in clear, relatively warm, shallow marine waters by both biological and abiological processes. During the maximum, deepest, incursion of marine waters, limestone and deep-water mud accumulated in the western Grand Canyon, while stromatolites and shallow-water mud accumulated in the eastern Grand Canyon. Following the maximum incursion of marine waters, the sea slowly regressed, and it accumulated in nearshore and coastal environments as indicated by ripple marks, mudcracks, oxidized shales, and other evidence of periodic subaerial exposure found in the upper part of the Bass Formation. Evaporite-forming conditions probably occurred, also during this regressive phase. Eventually, a shallow, near-shore marine environment, coastal plain mudflats, and deltas that marked the beginning of Hakatai Shale deposition – dominated the Grand Canyon area.

== Age ==
The uranium-lead dating of zircons from an ash bed in the Bass Formation, argon–argon dating of overlying igneous rocks, and thermochronologic studies of the underling Vishnu Basement Rocks – constrain the age of the Bass Formation and associated Unkar Group. Zircons from air-fallen, volcanic ash beds in its lower part yielded a uranium-lead date of 1,254.8 ± 1.6 Ma. This date is consistent with radiometric ages of Precambrian strata interpreted to be correlative with the Bass Formation and its age estimated from earlier paleomagnetic studies. In addition, this date is consistent with the younger Cardenas Basalt having been erupted about 1,104 Ma. Finally, the uranium-lead dating of zircons is consistent with studies of the underlying Vishnu Basement Rocks that indicate they were exhumed from depths of 25 to 10 km depths between 1,750 and 1,660 Ma and from a depth of 10 km to the surface on which the Bass Formation lies between 1,660 and 1,250 Ma.

== Asbestos mines ==
The presence of chrysotile asbestos veins in the Bass Formation was first noted in early exploration of the Grand Canyon by the Powell expedition. Shortly after 1890, mining claims were filed on these asbestos deposits. Later in the early 1900s, William Wallace Bass mined asbestos in the Shinumo Creek-Hakatai Canyon area and John Hance mined asbestos in Asbestos Canyon. Although these deposits had good quality asbestos, little asbestos, at most a few tons, was produced from them because these deposits were fairly small and difficult to access. These asbestos mines are now abandoned and protected as historical sites.

In the mid-1960s, Gregory H. Billingsley found several veins of asbestos up to 7.6 cm (3.0 in) thick at the mouth of Tapeats Creek. These veins outcrop upstream along the Colorado River for nearly two miles up to Stone Creek. Green chlorite, green garnet, and talc are associated with the asbestos veins, which occur in a 0.6-to-0.9 m (2-to-3 ft) thick contact-metamorphism-zone associated with basaltic sills. For unknown reasons, claims were never filed on these veins and no attempts were made to mine them.

The Grand Canyon asbestos deposits are very similar in origin and nature to the asbestos deposits of the Sierra Ancha-Salt River Canyon region of Gila County, Arizona. As in the case of the Bass Formation, these chrysotile asbestos deposits are of the contact metamorphic type that occur in magnesium-bearing Mesoproterozoic dolomites and limestones altered by basaltic dikes and sills. As in the case of the Grand Canyon asbestos deposits, dolomite and limestone reacted with silica-bearing fluids, heated by the basalt intrusions, forming the serpentine mineral chrysotile. Much like the Grand Canyon asbestos deposits, these basaltic sills and dikes range in age from 1,050 to 1,140 Ma. Quite unlike the Grand Canyon asbestos deposits, the asbestos deposits of the Sierra Ancha-Salt River Canyon region have been extremely productive.

== See also ==
- Geology of the Grand Canyon area
- Great Unconformity
