= Cheops Pyramid =

Landform in the Grand Canyon, Arizona

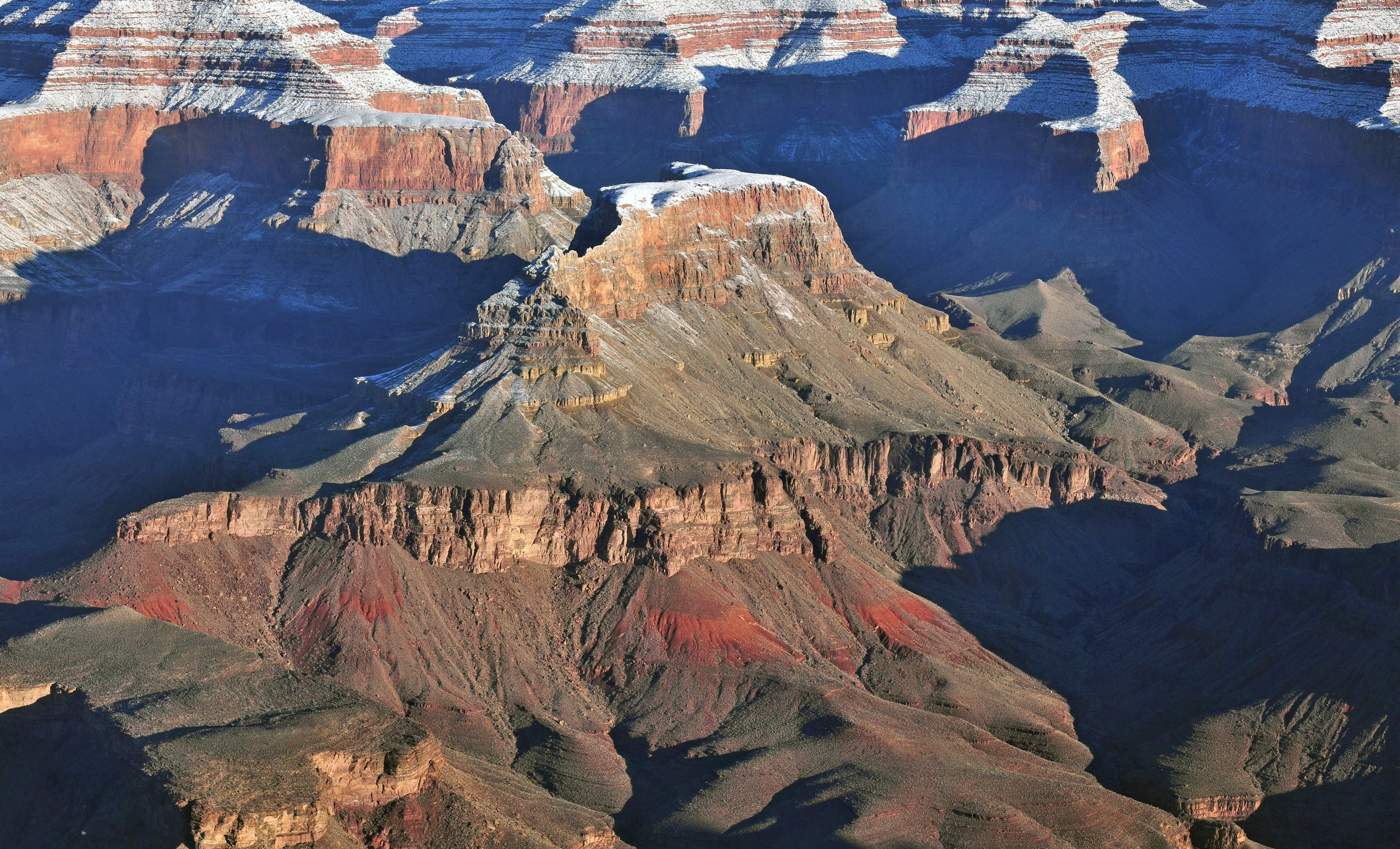
- South aspect, from South Rim's Yavapai Point

Highest point
- Elevation: 5,401 ft (1,646 m)
- Prominence: 800 ft (240 m)
- Parent peak: Isis Temple (7,006 ft)
- Isolation: 1.72 mi (2.77 km)
- Coordinates: 36°07′13″N 112°07′12″W

Geography
- Location within Arizona Location within the United States
- Country: United States
- State: Arizona
- County: Coconino
- Protected area: Grand Canyon National Park
- Parent range: Kaibab Plateau; Colorado Plateau
- Topo map: USGS Phantom Ranch

Geology
- Rock type(s): sandstone, limestone, shale

Climbing
- Easiest route: class 4 climbing

Cheops Pyramid is a 5,401-foot-elevation (1,646-meter) summit located in the Grand Canyon, in Coconino County of Arizona, US.

== Description ==
This butte is situated four miles north of Grand Canyon Village, 2.5 miles south-southwest of Buddha Temple, and 1.7 mile south-southeast of Isis Temple, which is the nearest higher neighbor. Topographic relief is significant as it rises 3,000 feet (910 meters) above the Colorado River in 1.5 mile. It was named by George Wharton James for the fanciful resemblance to the famous pyramid constructed by Egyptian Pharaoh Cheops. This was in keeping with Clarence Dutton's tradition of naming geographical features in the Grand Canyon after mythological deities. This butte's toponym was officially adopted in 1906 by the U.S. Board on Geographic Names. According to the Köppen climate classification system, Cheops Pyramid is located in a Cold semi-arid climate zone.

== Geology ==
Cheops Pyramid is a flat-topped erosional remnant composed of Mississippian Redwall Limestone, overlaying the green shale slopes of the Cambrian Tonto Group, and below that red shale and Shinumo Quartzite of the Proterozoic Unkar Group. Precipitation runoff from Cheops Pyramid drains south to the Colorado River via Phantom Creek (east), and Ninetyone Mile Creek (west).

== See also ==
- Geology of the Grand Canyon area
- Grand Canyon Supergroup

== Gallery ==
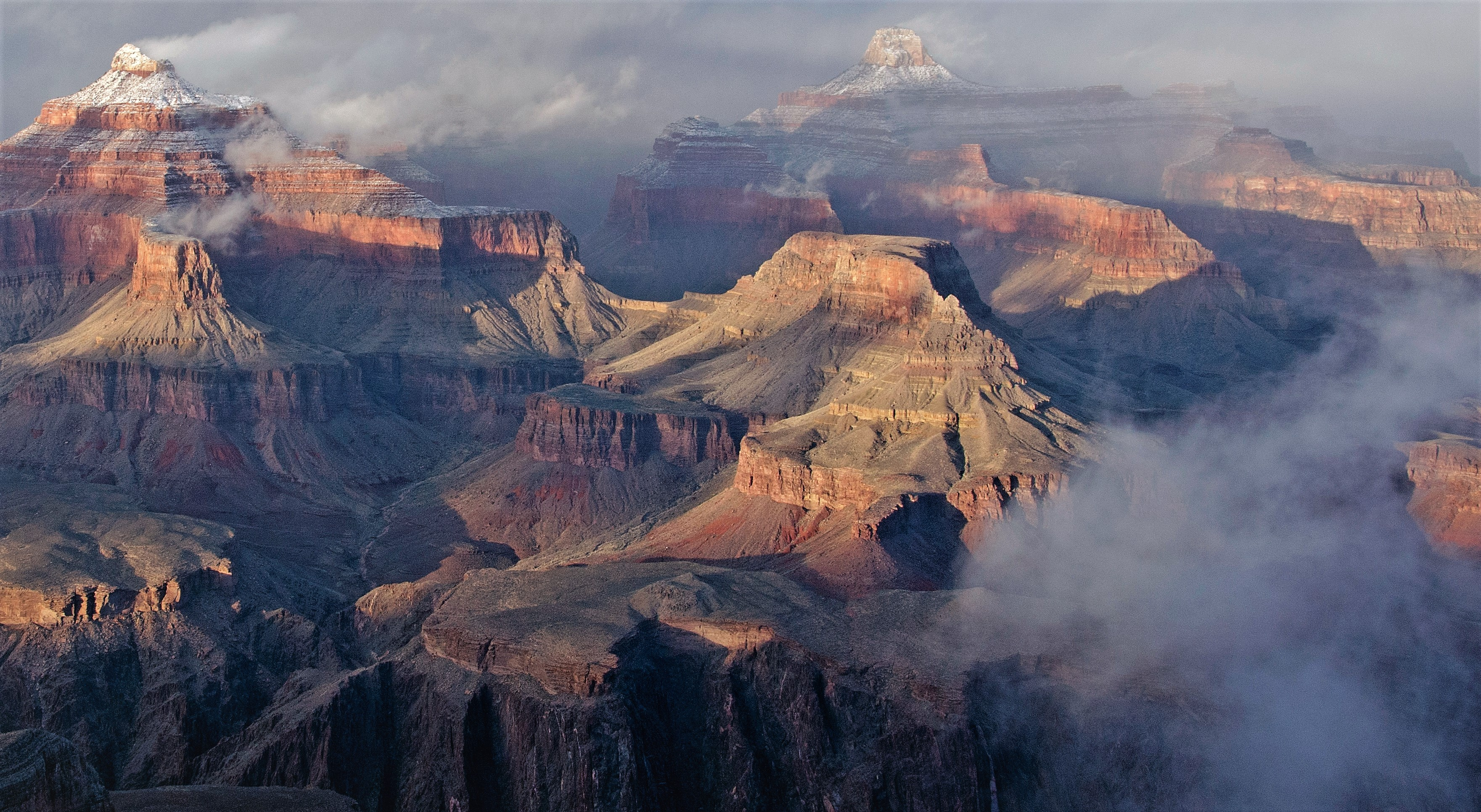
Isis Temple left, Cheops Pyramid in front, Buddha Temple right of center in back.

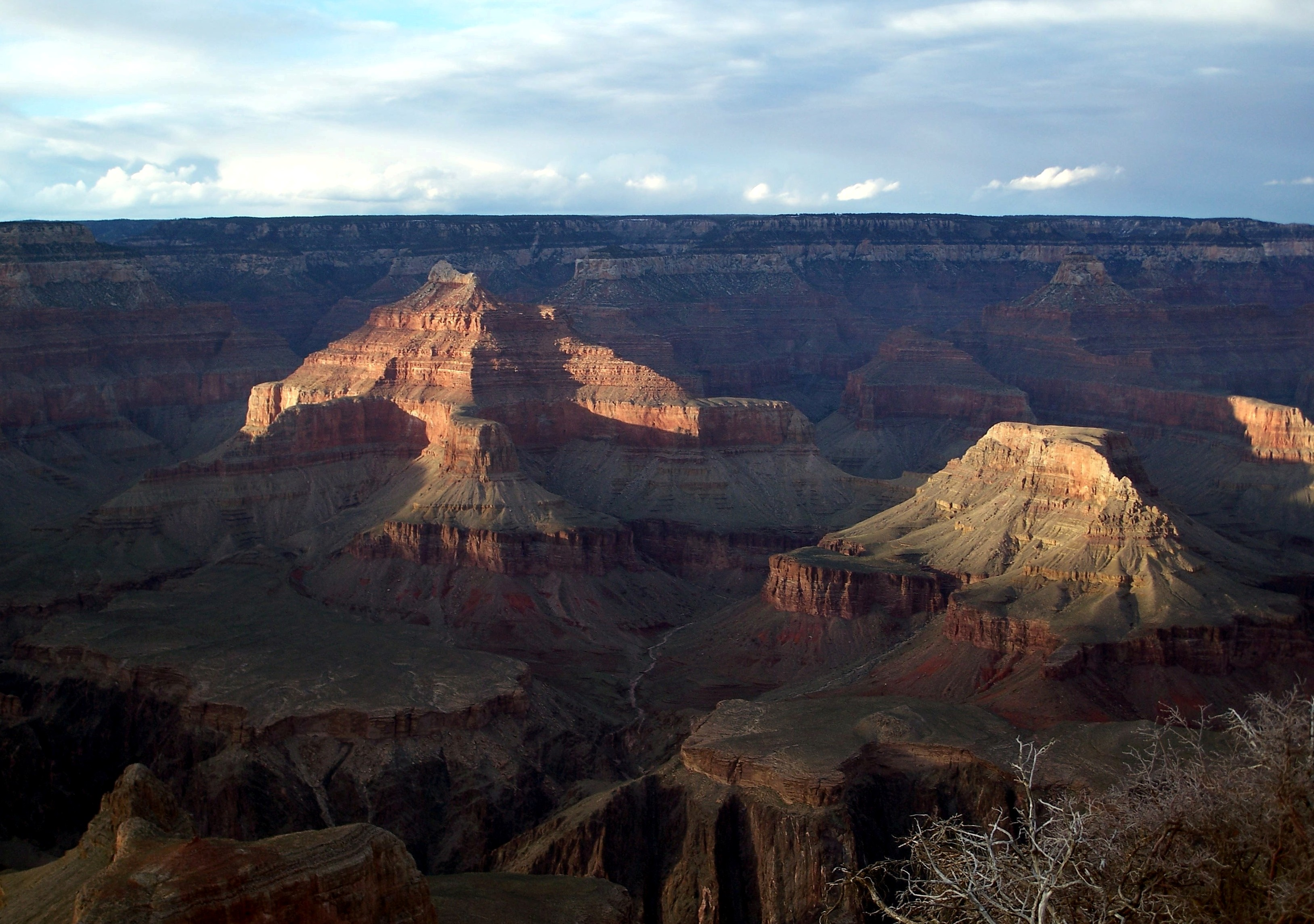
Isis Temple left, Cheops Pyramid right

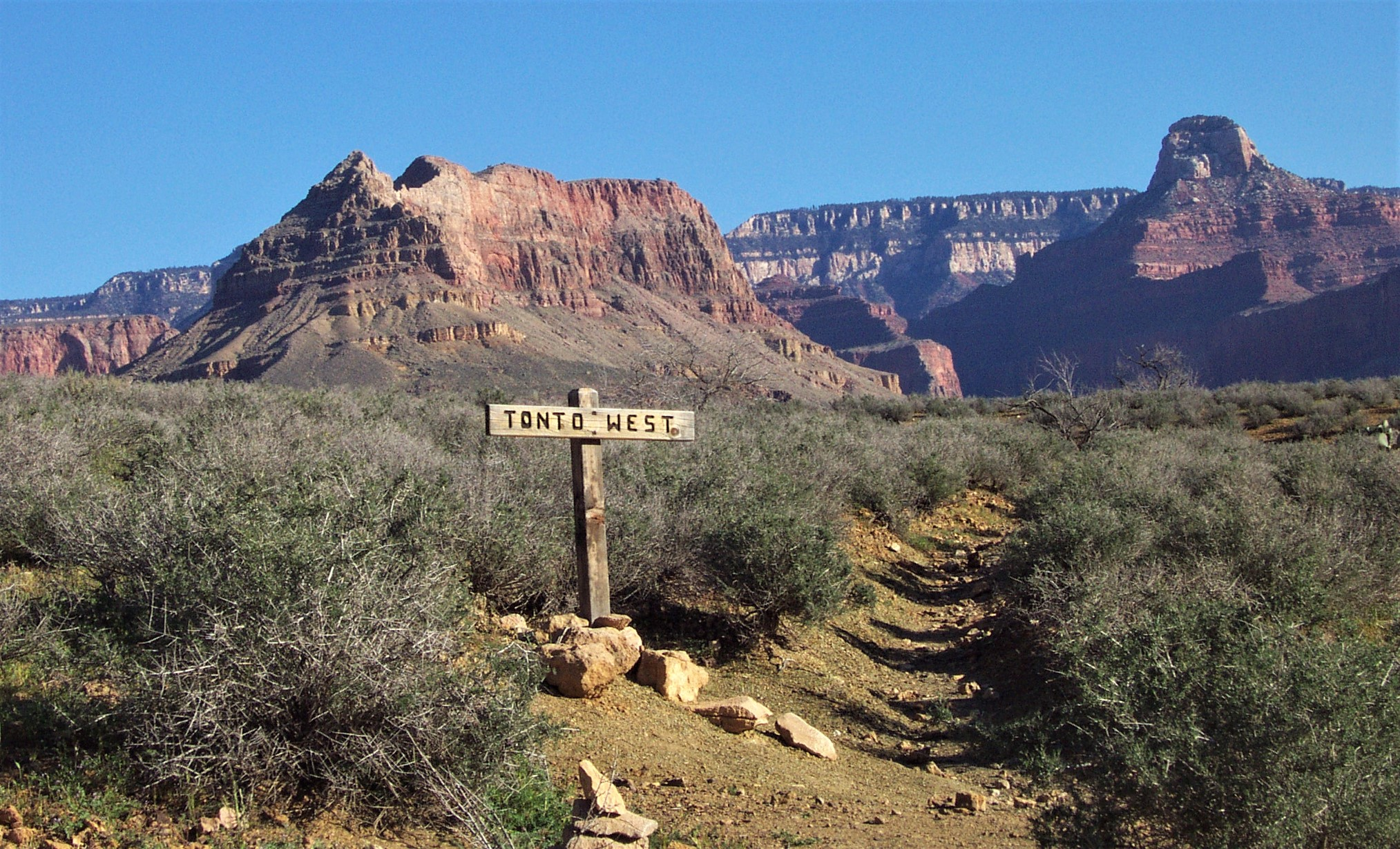
Cheops Pyramid (left) and Buddha Temple (right), seen from junction of the Tonto West Trail and Bright Angel Trail

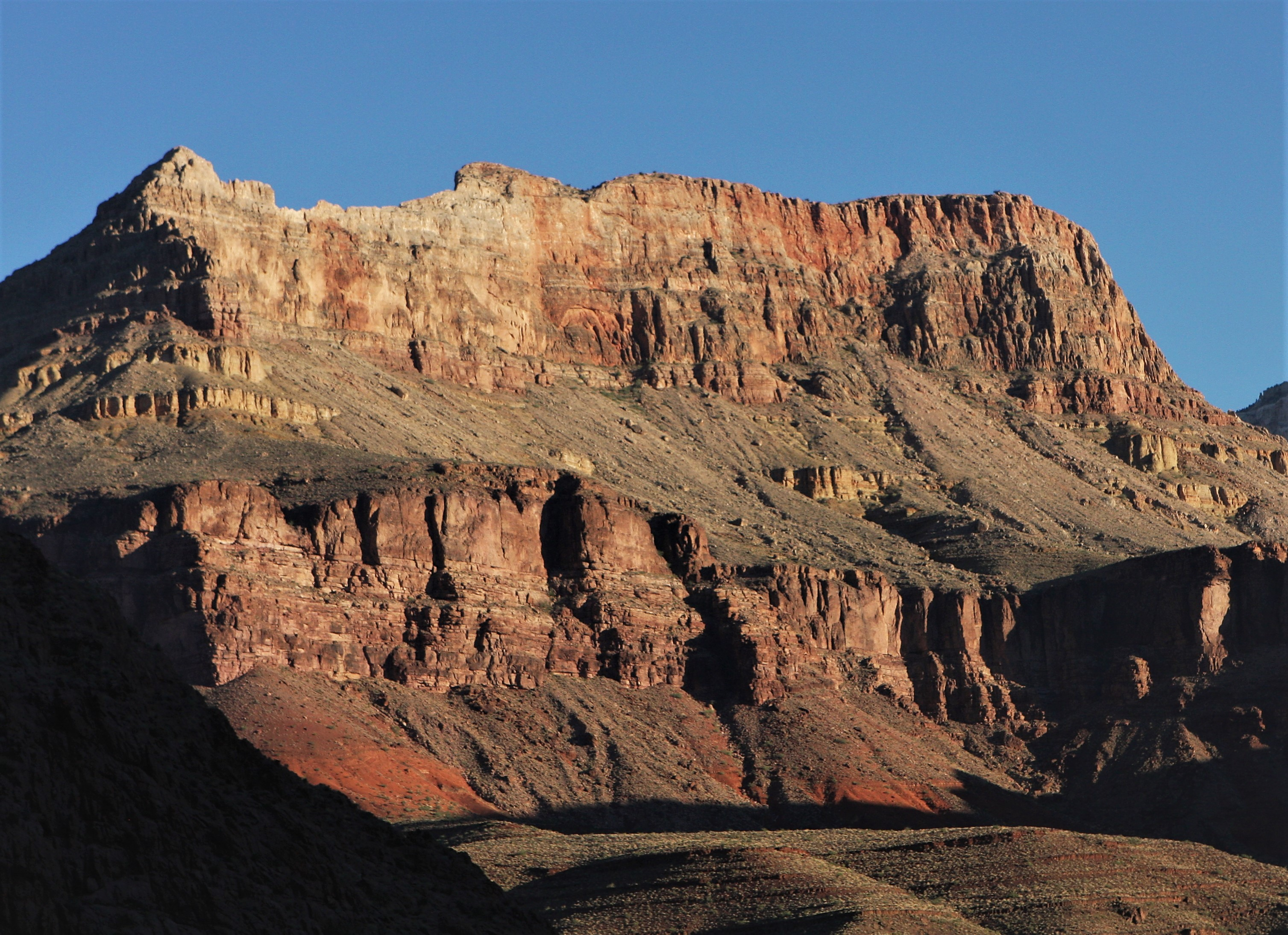
Southeast aspect from Bright Angel Trail

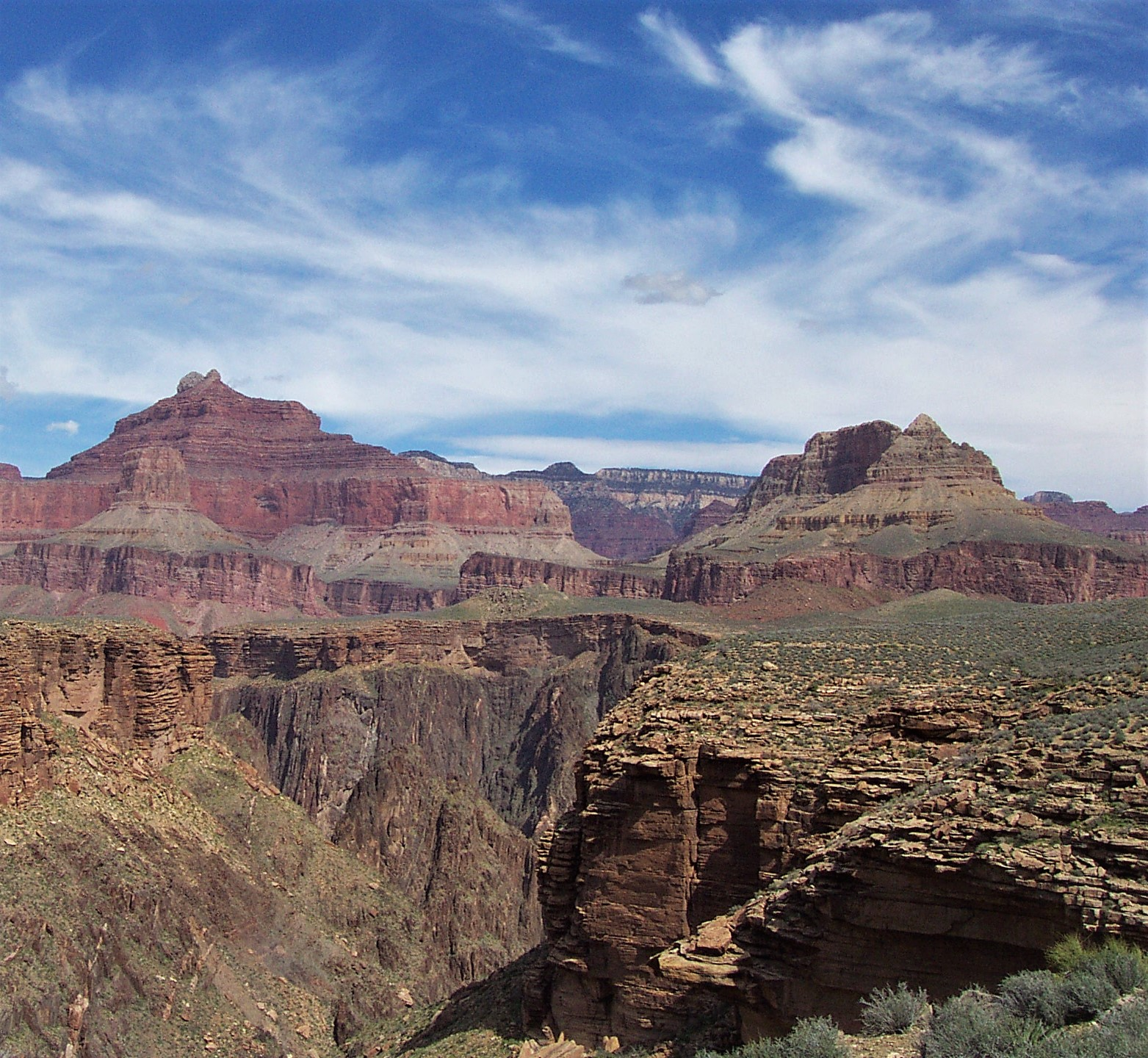
Isis Temple left, Cheops Pyramid right

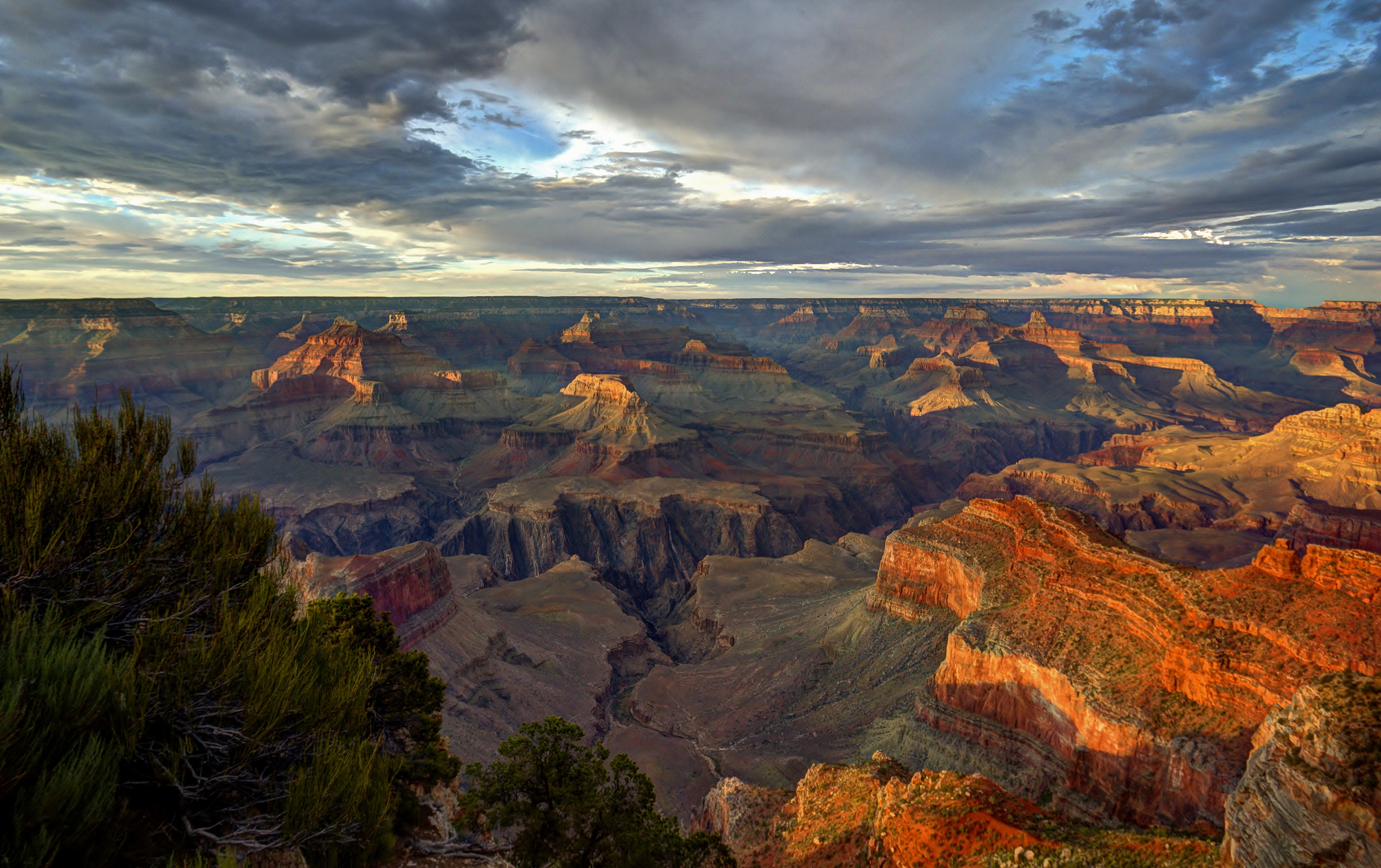
Cheops Pyramid in bullseye, from Hopi Point

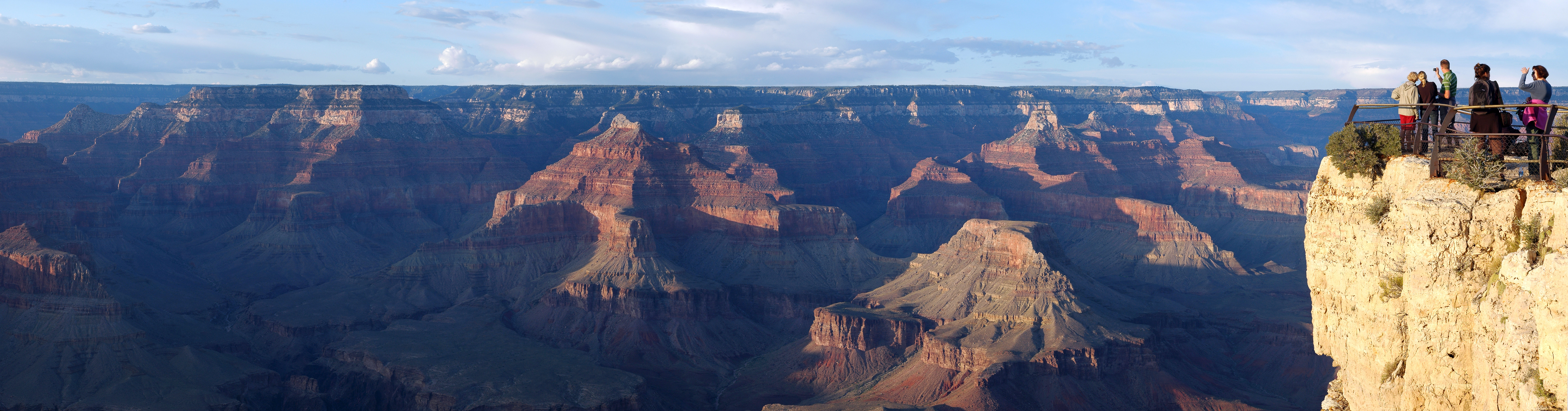
Cheops Pyramid below onlookers at Maricopa Point

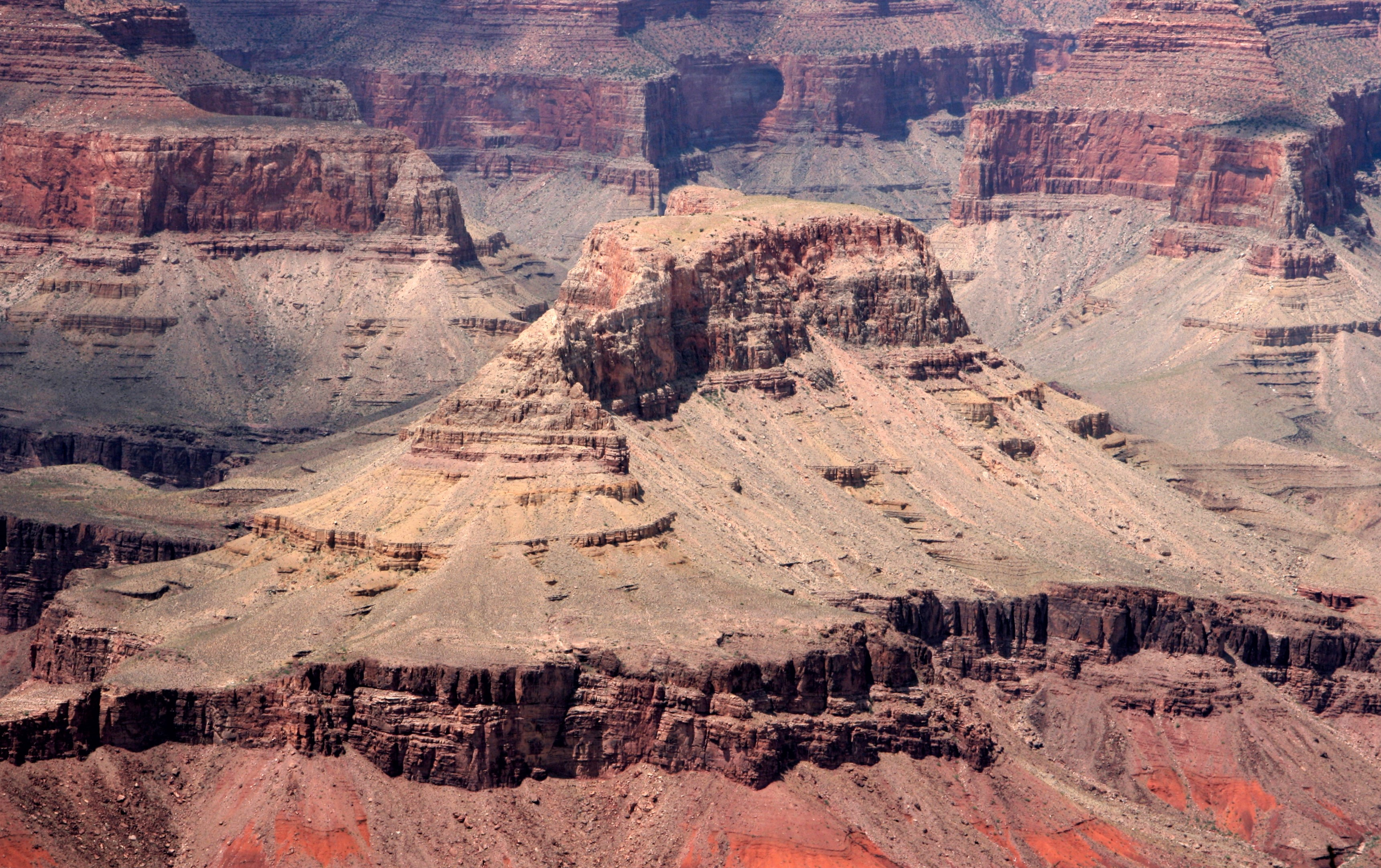

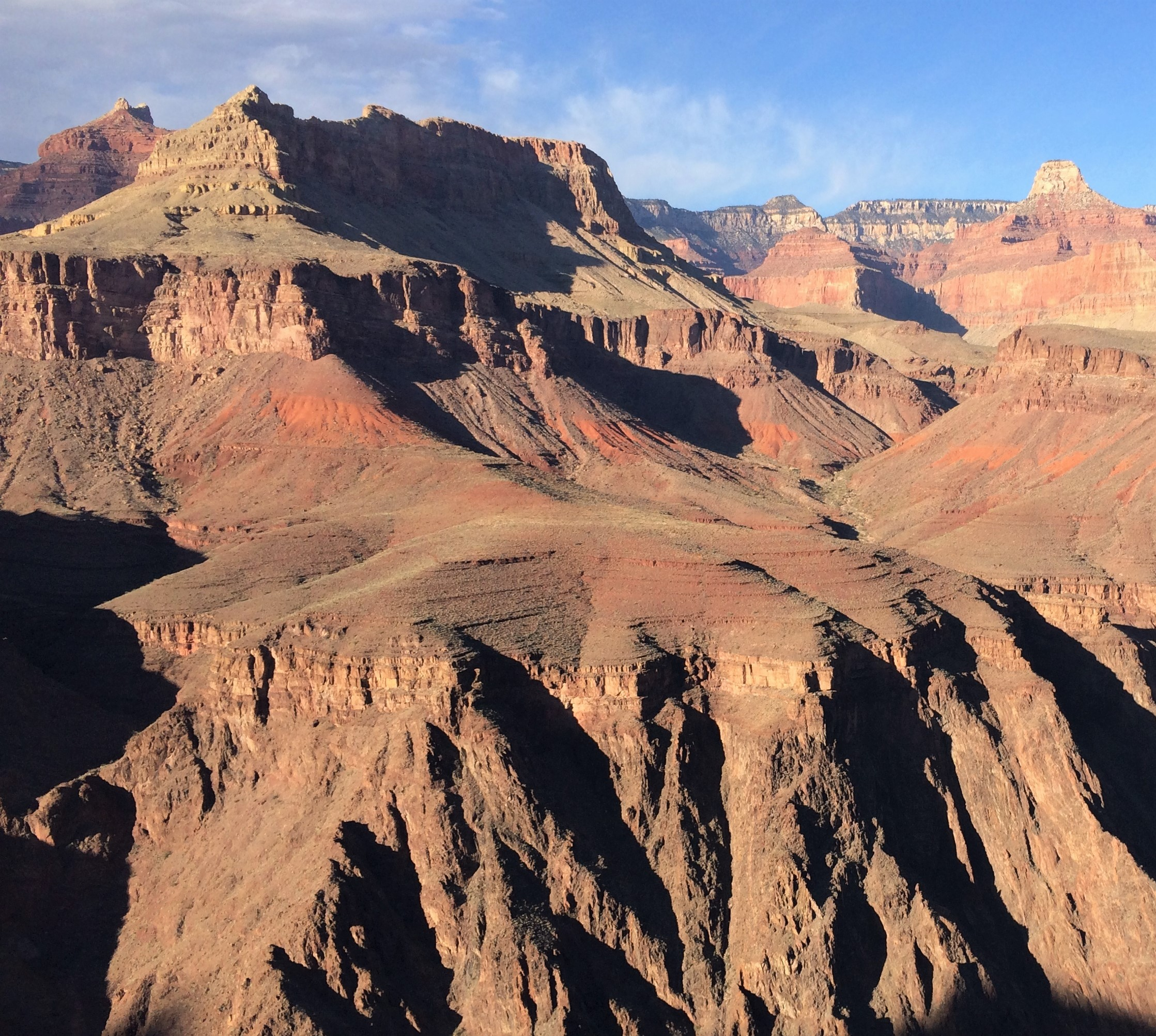
Cheops Pyramid (left) and Buddha Temple (right)
