= Unkar Group =

Sequence of geologic strata of Proterozoic age

- Stratigraphic range: Meso-Proterozoic, between 1,254 and 1,100 Ma
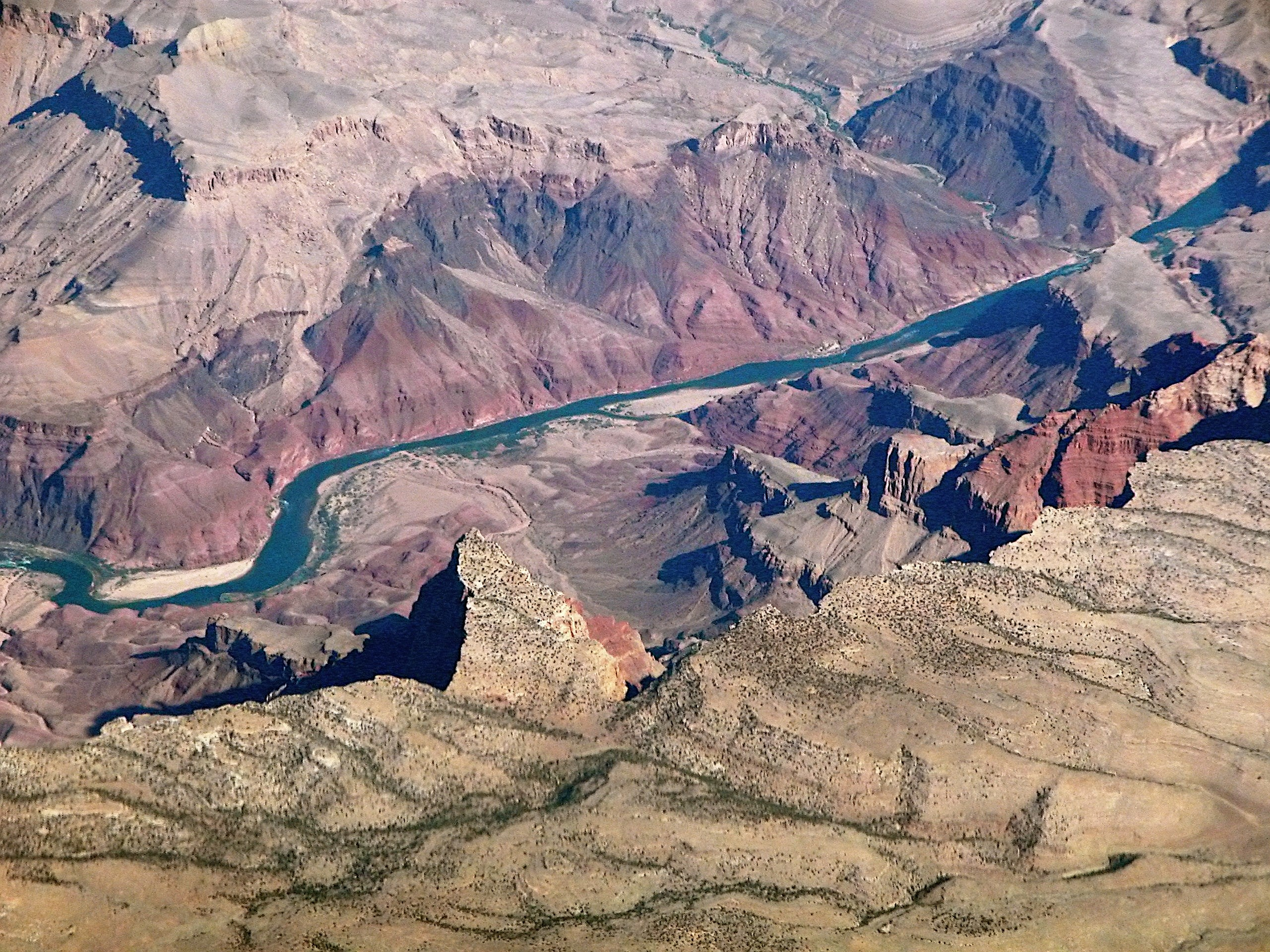
- Cardenas Basalt and Dox Formation of the Unkar Group; Reddish Dox Formation below blackish Cardenas Basalt, upstream from Tanner Graben
- Type: Geologic group
- Unit of: Grand Canyon Supergroup
- Sub-units: Cardenas Basalt; Dox Formation; Shinumo Quartzite volcanic dikes as source for Cardenas Basalt; Hakatai Shale; Bass Formation
- Underlies: Nankoweap Formation and, as part of the Great Unconformity, the Tapeats Sandstone
- Overlies: Vishnu Basement Rocks
- Area: Arizona, east Grand Canyon, Lava Butte region, on Colorado River, near Lipan Point
- Thickness: 1,600 to 2,200 meters (5,200 to 7,200 ft)

Lithology
- Primary: sandstone, siltstone, shale, and basaltic volcanic rocks
- Other: dolomite and limestone

Location
- Region: Arizona northcentral AZ into southcentral Utah in the subsurface
- Country: Southwestern United States

Type section
- Named for: Unkar Valley
- Named by: Walcott (1894) and Noble (1910, 1914)

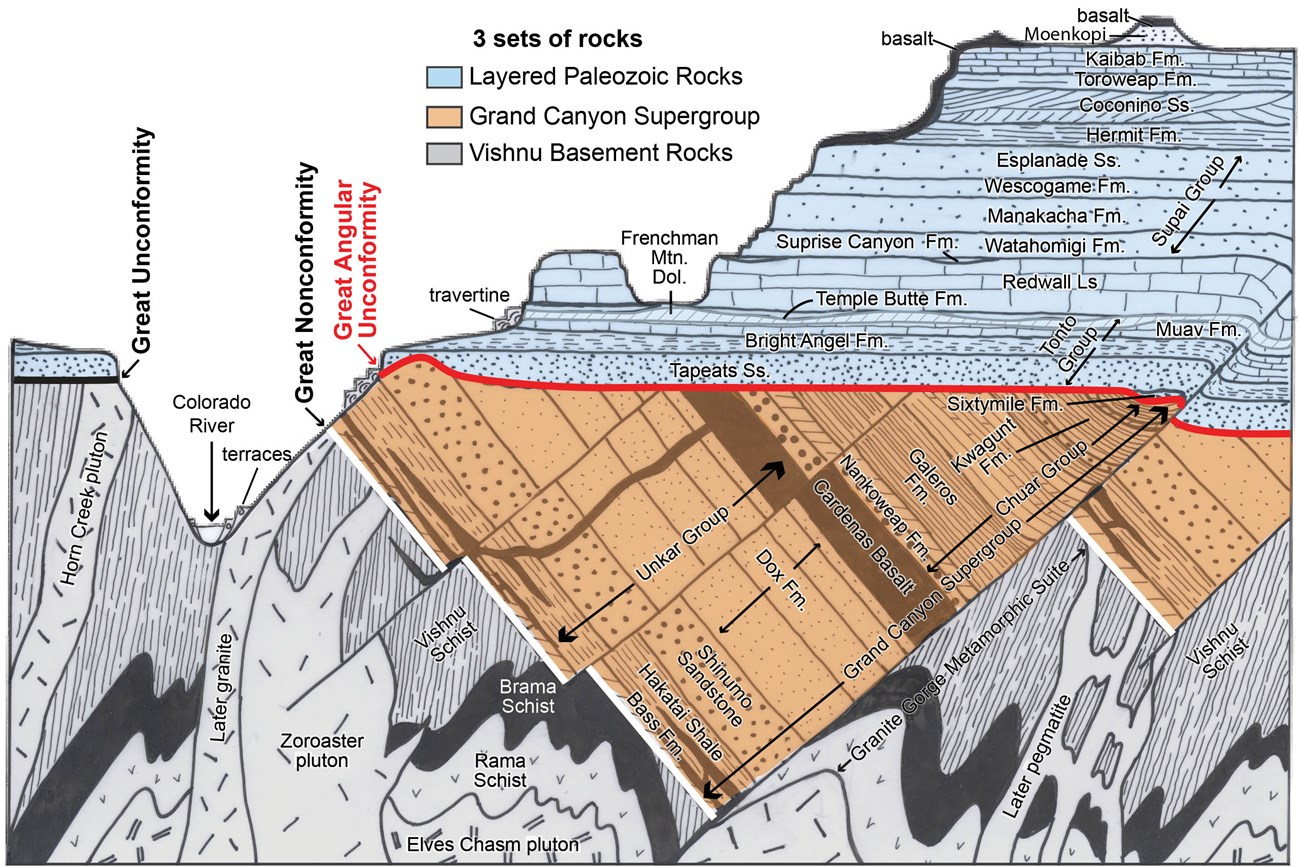
Figure 1. A geologic cross section of the Grand Canyon.

The Unkar Group is a sequence of strata of Proterozoic age that are subdivided into five geologic formations and exposed within the Grand Canyon, Arizona, Southwestern United States. The Unkar Group is the basal formation of the Grand Canyon Supergroup. The Unkar is about 1,600 to 2,200 m (5,200 to 7,200 ft) thick and composed, in ascending order, of the Bass Formation, Hakatai Shale, Shinumo Quartzite, Dox Formation, and Cardenas Basalt. The Cardenas Basalt and Dox Formation are found mostly in the eastern region of Grand Canyon. The Shinumo Quartzite, Hakatai Shale, and Bass Formation are found in central Grand Canyon. The Unkar Group accumulated approximately between 1250 and 1104 Ma (1,104 million years ago, 1.1 billion). In ascending order, the Unkar Group is overlain by the Nankoweap Formation, about 113 to 150 m (371 to 492 ft) thick; the Chuar Group, about 1,900 m (6,200 ft) thick; and the Sixtymile Formation, about 60 m (200 ft) thick. These are all of the units of the Grand Canyon Supergroup. The Unkar Group makes up approximately half of the thickness of the Grand Canyon Supergroup.

In general, the strata comprising the Unkar Group dip northeast (10°–30°) toward normal faults that dip 60+° toward the southwest. This can be seen at the Palisades fault in the eastern part of the main Unkar Group outcrop area (below East Rim).

Within the central Grand Canyon, Unkar strata occur in small, rotated, downfaulted blocks or slivers where they commonly are only partially exposed. Within this center part of the Grand Canyon, the Unkar Group is incomplete because pre-Tonto Group erosion has removed strata above the level of the middle part of the Dox Formation. The missing part of the Unkar Group and the remainder of the overlying Grand Canyon Supergroup are preserved in a prominent syncline and fault block that is exposed in the eastern Grand Canyon. Examples of these fault blocks can be seen at the Isis Temple prominence, "Cheops Pyramid," and the intersection of Phantom Creek with the Bright Angel Canyon, (North Kaibab Trail). The Unkar Group also contains thick basaltic sills and a number of small, dark dikes. In the area of Desert View and west of Palisades of the Desert, the basaltic sills form very prominent, dark gray cliffs.

Using gravity and aeromagnetic data, combined with gravity modeling, it was inferred that Proterozoic grabens, and half-grabens filled with strata of the Unkar Group – lie buried beneath Phanerozoic rocks in northern Arizona that surround the Grand Canyon. The grabens and half grabens filled with strata of the Unkar group are associated with northwest–southeast trending Mesoproterozoic fault systems that have curving, southwest-dipping traces. These fault systems were later reactivated during the Neoproterozoic, to form basins in which the following Chuar Group accumulated, and during the Cenozoic, to form geologic structures, i.e., faults, anticlines, synclines, and monoclines, that are exposed at the surface.

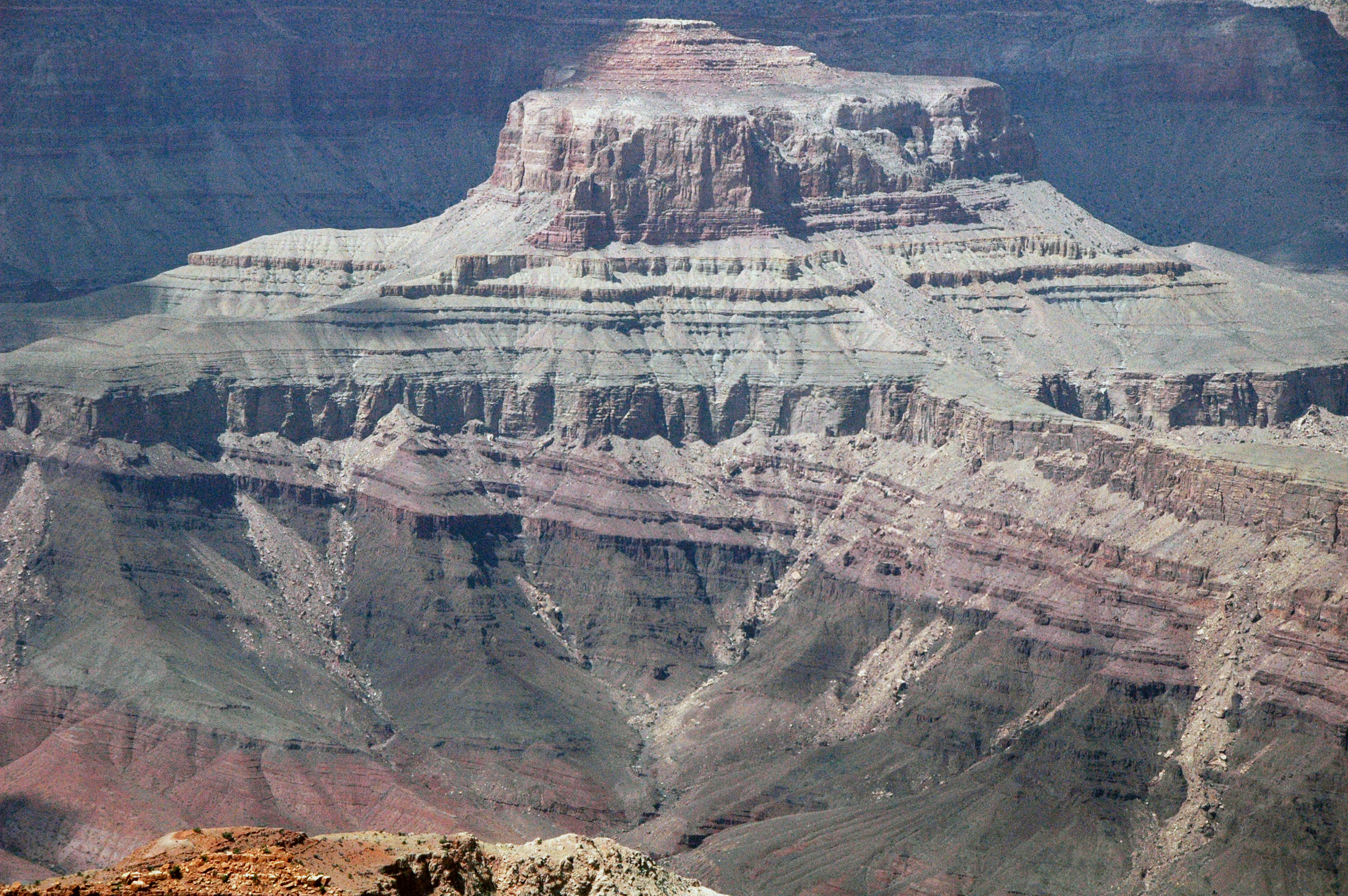
Close-up of Apollo Temple showing angular unconformity between Tonto Group and Unkar Group

Major unconformities separate the Unkar Group from the strata overlying and underlying it. First, the Unkar Group, as the bottom unit of the Grand Canyon Supergroup, lies directly upon deeply eroded granites, gneisses, pegmatites, and schists that comprise Vishnu Basement Rocks. Second, an angular unconformity, with a dip of less than 10°, separates the base of the Nankoweap Formation from the underlying Unkar Group. Finally, a well-defined angular unconformity at the base of the relatively flat-lying Tonto Group separates it from the underlying faulted and folded strata of the Unkar Group and the rest of the Grand Canyon Supergroup that are typically tilted at angles of 10°–30°.

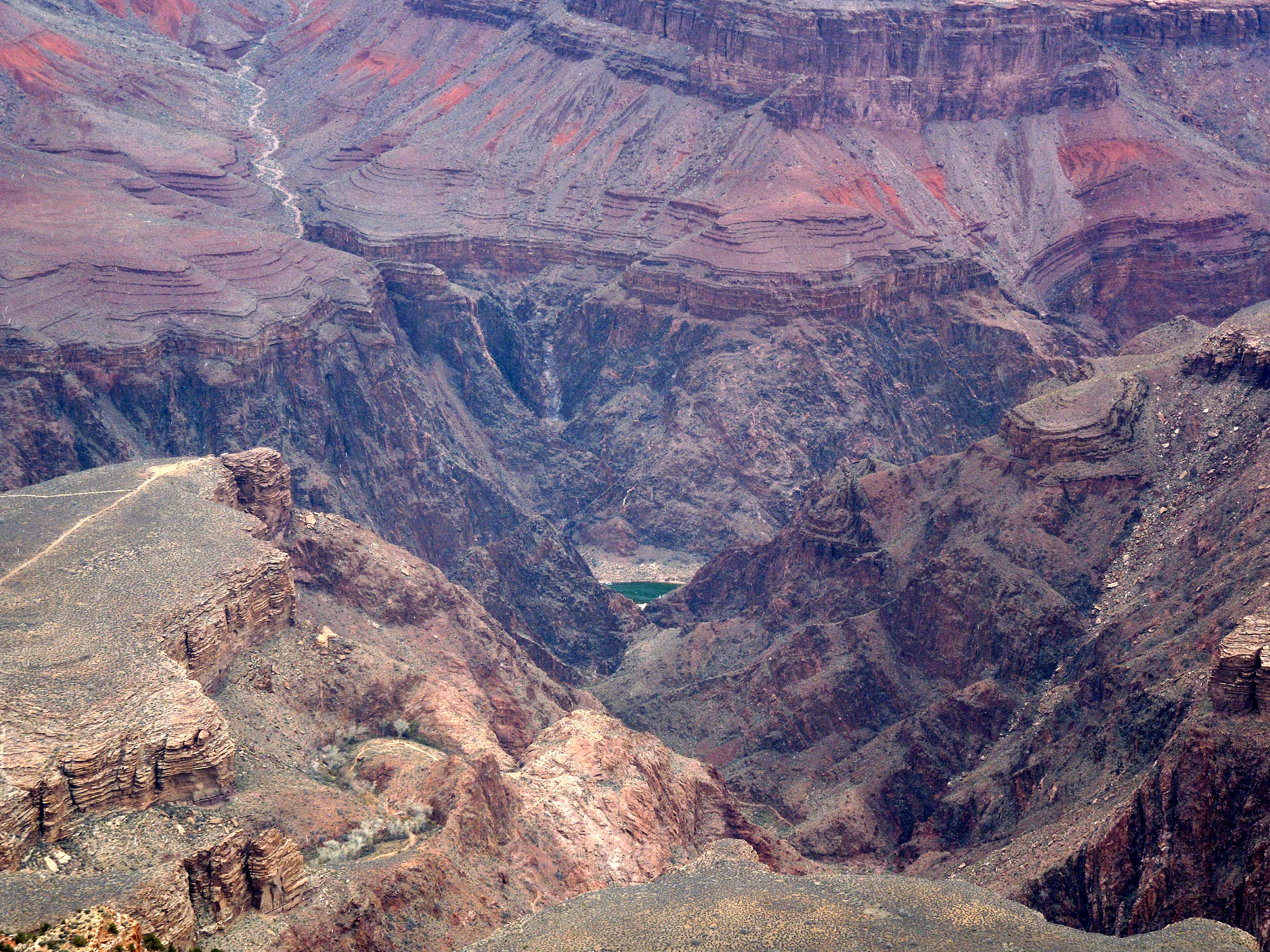
Shinumo Quartzite cliffs upon colorful Hakatai Shale upon horizontal thin beddings of Bass Formation (upon Vishnu Basement Rocks of Granite Gorge) (expandable high-resolution photo)

The western section of the Unkar group can be highlighted in a photo of three Unkar units below Isis Temple sitting on Vishnu Basement Rocks of Granite Gorge.

== Nomenclature ==
The Unkar Group was first recognized and named by Charles D. Walcott as the "Unkar terrane" in 1894. It and his “Chuar terrane” comprised what was then named the “Grand Canyon series” of "Proterozoic (Algonkian)" age. He regarded the Cardenas Basalt, unnamed at that time, as the uppermost unit in his "Unkar terrane." In 1910 and 1914, Levi F. Noble later divided what he called the "Unkar Group" into five subunits, which were the Hotauta Conglomerate, Bass Limestone, Hakatai Shale, Shinumo Quartzite, and Dox Sandstone. The still unnamed Cardenas Basalt is only briefly noted as exposures of it are absent in the Shinumo 15-minute quadrangle. Although a recognized part of the Unkar Group, the basalt lava flows that overlie the Dox Formation were generally ignored and simply described as "basalt and diabase." In 1938, Charles R. Keyes applied the name "Cardenesan Series" to the basaltic volcanic rocks within the Unkar Group. In 1973, the current definition of the Unkar Group developed when the Nankoweap Formation, which had been earlier added to the Unkar Group was formally removed from it and the unconformity that separates the Nankoweap Formation from the Unkar Group – was recognized.

== Formations of the Unkar Group ==
The Bass Formation not only contains gray to red-gray dolomite and sandy dolomite but also interbedded purple-brown to dark red and reddish brown sandstone (arkose), and silty sandstone, prominent interbeds of conglomerate, and subordinate interbeds of argillite and limestone. A prominent conglomerate, the Hotauta Member, fills paleovalleys cut into the underlying Vishu basement complex at its base. The Bass Formation also contains stromatolite beds and thin volcanic ash layers. The Hotauta Member is regarded to be fluvial in origin. The remainder of the Bass Formation accumulated in relatively warm shallow marine waters.

The Hakatai Shale consists of purple, reddish-purple, reddish-orange, and pale purple or lavender mudstone, sandy siltstone, siltstone, and arkosic sandstone. The brightly colored slopes of the Hakatai Shale contrasts sharply against the grayish outcrops of the Bass Formation. The sloping exposures of the Hakatai Shale also contrast greatly with the steep cliffs formed by the overlying Shinumo Quartzite. Stromatolites occur in the transitional zone between the Hakatai Shale and Bass Formation. The Hakatai Shale accumulated in low-energy, shallow, near-shore, marine environments.

In sharp contrast to argillaceous strata above and below it, the Shinumo Quartzite consists characteristically of beds that are red, brown, or purple sedimentary quartzites and lesser massive white, red, or purple sandstone; also conglomeratic sandstone. Within these cliff-forming sandstones, mudstone-rich intervals occur. Some of these sandstone beds exhibit well-developed soft-sediment deformation structures. No fossils have been found in the Shinumo Quartzite. The lower and middle parts of the Shinumo Quartzite accumulated in coastal tidal flats and the upper part of it represents the deposits of river deltas. The gradational contact between the Shinumo Quartzite and Dox Formation above indicates a shift from deposition in coastal deltas – to fluvial deposition by a large river system. Of note, the 'soft-sediment deformation' seen in this Shinumo Quartzite formation indicates significant earthquake and tectonic activity during its deposition.

The Dox Formation consists of a heterogeneous mixture of light-tan to greenish brown, siliceous quartz sandstone; calcareous lithic and arkosic sandstone; dark-brown-to-green shale and mudstone; red mudstone, siltstone, and quartz sandstone; sandy argillite; micaceous mudstone; and red quartzose, silty sandstone. In ascending order, these sediments have been subdivided into the Escalante Creek, Solomon Temple, Comanche Point, and Ochoa Point Members. Stromatolites have been reported from the Comanche Point Member. The Dox Formation locally interfingers with, and is baked by, basalt lava flows of the overlying Cardenas Basalt. Within the central Grand Canyon, pre-Tapeats Sandstone erosion has removed parts of the Unkar Group above the level of the middle part of the Dox Formation. The missing part of the Dox Formation and overlying Cardenas Basalt and Chuar Group can be found in a prominent syncline and fault block in the eastern Grand Canyon. The Dox Formation accumulated in a variety of marine, coastal, estuarine, and fluvial environments.

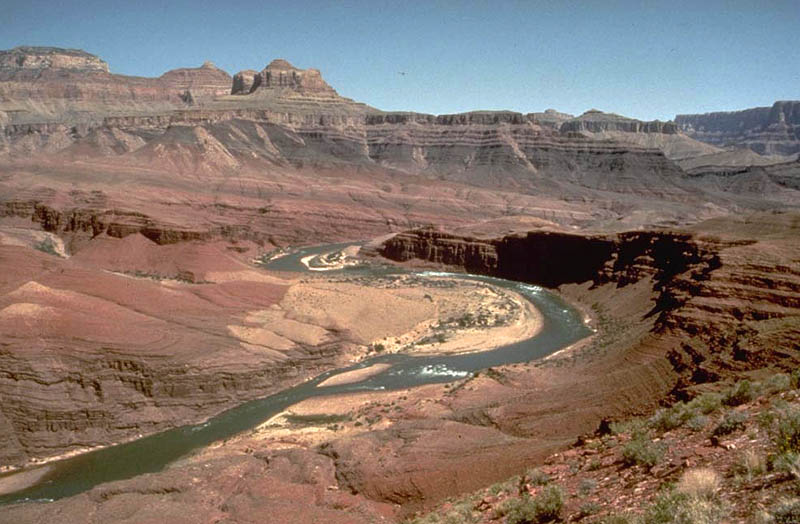
Deep reddish, (and dipping), Dox Formation overlain by Cardenas Basalt, in contact above with multi-banded, horizontal Nankoweap Formation-(Grand Canyon Supergroup), downstream from Tanner Canyon, Tanner Rapid, and Tanner Graben.

The Cardenas Basalt is composed mainly of thin discontinuous beds of pahoehoe lava flows of olivine-rich basalt. The lower part of this formation consists of complexly interbedded, thin, and discontinuous beds of basalt, hyaloclastite, and sandstone that form low, talus-covered slopes. The upper unit of the Cardenas Basalt consists of cliff-forming basaltic and andesitic lava flows that are interbedded with beds of breccia, sandstone, and lapillite. No fossils have been found in the Cardenas Basalt. The Cardenas Basalt was formed by the subaerial eruption of basaltic and andesitic magma in wet coastal environments such as river deltas or tidal flats. Angular unconformities of vastly differing magnitudes separate the Cardenas Basalt from the overlying Nankoweap Formation and Tonto Group.

Mafic sills and dikes (basalt resp. diabase) intrude all strata of the Unkar Group below the Cardenas Basalt. They consist of black, medium- to coarse-grained, olivine-rich basalt that contains plagioclase, olivine, clinopyroxene, magnetite-ilmenite, and biotite. Their chemical composition indicates that they share a common source with the pyroclastic deposits and lavas of the Cardenas Basalt. The isochron ages of these sills and dikes and the Cardenas Basalt lavas are basically identical. Only sills are exposed in outcrops of the Bass Formation and Hakatai Shale. These sills range in thickness from 23 m (75 ft) at Hance Rapids, eastern Grand Canyon, to 300 m (980 ft) in Hakatai Canyon in the Shinumo Creek area. Basaltic sills form very prominent, dark gray cliffs in the area below Desert View and west of Palisades of the Desert. Exposures of the Shinumo Quartzite, and Dox Formation expose several basaltic dikes. The feeder dikes to the basaltic sills are not exposed. However, the feeder dikes for the Cardenas Basalt can be traced, discontinuously, to within a few meters of their bases.

== Unconformities ==
The base of the Unkar Group is a major unconformity that also forms the base of the Grand Canyon Supergroup. This unconformity is a nonconformity that separates the underlying and deeply eroded crystalline basement, which consists of granites, gneisses, pegmatites, and schists of the Vishnu Basement Rocks, from stratified Proterozoic rocks of the Unkar Group. This contact is a remarkably smooth surface that has a relief of about 6 m (20 ft) in the Shinuino 15-minute topographic quadrangle and 15 m (49 ft) in both the Bright Angel and Vishnu 15-minute topographic quadrangles. In Hotauta Canyon, and at Granite Narrows, this surface is extremely smooth with a relief of only a few meters. The greatest relief on this surface can be seen opposite the mouth of Shinumo Creek where low rounded hills of Vishnu Basement Rocks rise 6 m (20 ft) above the general level of a relatively flat surface. The Hotauta Member of the Bass Formation fills shallow paleovalleys that are part of this nonconformity. The Vishnu Basement Rocks underlying this surface are often deeply weathered to an average depth of 3 m (9.8 ft) below it. Where it has not been removed by erosion prior to and during the deposition of the overlying Bass Formation, a residual regolith – developed by subaerial weathering of the underlying basement rocks – is present. Typically, this regolith consists of dark-reddish brown, structureless, ferruginous sediment that is usually a few centimeters to 30 cm (0.98 ft) thick. This contact is regarded to be a classic example of an ancient peneplain.

The contact between the Tonto Group and Unkar Group is a prominent angular unconformity, which is part of the Great Unconformity. The surface of this angular unconformity truncates dipping strata comprising the folded and faulted Unkar Group. Though this surface is typically a plane, differential erosion of the tilted strata of the Unkar Group left resistant beds of the upper layer Cardenas Basalt and the middle layer Shinumo Quartzite as ancient hills, called monadnocks. These ancient hills, which are ridges formed by block faulting, are up to 240 m (790 ft) tall. Thin drapes of Tapeats Sandstone of the Tonto Group either cover or drape onto most of these ancient monadnocks. However, the summits of the highest monadnocks protrude up through the base layer Tapeats Sandstone and are blanketed by overlying Bright Angel Shale as can be seen at Isis Temple. Lava Butte is a partially exhumed prehistoric monadnock associated with this unconformity that consists of Cardenas Basalt. These monadnocks served locally as sources of coarse-grained sediments during the marine transgression that deposited the Tapeats Sandstone (Tapeats Sea), and other members of the Tonto Group.

Within the Unkar Group, the contact between the Hakatai Shale and overlying Shinumo Sandstone is a distinct disconformity. This contact is the only significant unconformity that occurs within the Unkar Group. This disconformity is sharp and locally truncates cross-bedding and channels exhibited by sandstones in the underlying Hakatai Shale. Within the Shinumo Quartzite, a basal lag composed of a layer of conglomerate, which contains basement clasts up to 5 cm (2.0 in) across, lies on the eroded surface that forms this disconformity. This basal conglomerate contains quartzite clasts that lack any known equivalents in the Grand Canyon region. As documented by the dating of detrital zircon, this disconformity is estimated to represent a period of about 75 million years.

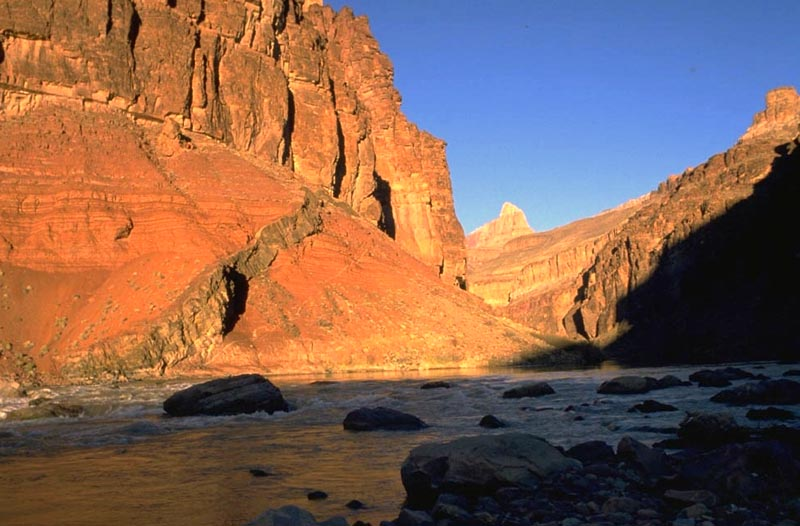
Basalt dike in bright-orange Hakatai Shale along Colorado River at Hance Rapid, river mile 76.5, Grand Canyon.

== Age ==
The age and exhumation history of the underlying Vishnu Basement Rocks constrain the age of the Unkar Group. Radiometric dating of these basement rocks demonstrate that these basement rocks underwent metamorphism and deformation at mid-crustal depths of about 20–25 km (12–16 mi) between about 1840 and 1660 Ma ago. Prior to the deposition of the Bass Formation, these rocks were uplifted to the Earth's surface from mid-crustal depths and eroded to form the surface of the nonconformity on which the Unkar Group lies. As these rocks were uplifted from mid-crustal depths, the timing of their cooling was recorded in cooling ages of feldspars and other minerals. As determined from these cooling ages, these basement rocks were uplifted from depths of 25 to 10 km (15.5 to 6.2 mi) between 1750 and 1660 Ma. Then, they were uplifted from a depth of 10 km (6.2 mi) to the Earth's surface between 1300 and 1250 Ma. Thus, the surface on which the Unkar Group accumulated, is about 1250 Ma old, and the Unkar Group that buried it, is younger.

The maximum age of the Unkar Group is also established by uranium-lead (U-Pb) dating of zircons from an ash bed from the Bass Formation in the basal Unkar Group of 1254 Ma near river Mile 78 (List of Colorado River rapids and features). The dating of detrital zircons from the Bass Formation have yielded dates of about 1200 Ma. These dates suggest that the 1254 Ma age may be a bit too old. However, these zircons likely underwent some lead loss, and, as a result these apparent dates are younger than their actual ages. As a result, the 1254 Ma dates remain the best estimate for the age of initial deposition of the Unkar Group.

Geologists have attempted to date the Cardenas Basalt for many years. On the basis of other geologic criteria, geologists have found that the dates, which range from 1,000 to 700 million years ago, obtained for the age of the Cardenas Basalt and upper age of the Unkar Group, were too young, and something was clearly perturbing the dating systematics. The current interpretation is that the deposition of the overlying Chuar Group, in a marine setting, disrupted the potassium-argon (K-Ar) radiometric system. Apparently, fluids associated with the deposition of the Chuar Group have altered the older Cardenas Basalt, partially degraded the minerals, and therefore producing a disruption in the K-Ar systematics. Using newer dating techniques and approaches not available to earlier geologists, the Cardenas Basalt and intrusive sills have been re-dated. New data acquired using newer dating techniques and approaches, indicate that the Cardenas Basalt erupted about 1,104 million years ago. This date marks the end of the deposition of the Unkar Group. These radiometric dates are corroborated by the radiometric dating of detrital micas and zircons from the Hakatai Shale, Shinumo Quartzite, and Dox Formation. Based on all of these radiometric dates, researchers have concluded that the Unkar Group was deposited between about 1254 and 1100 Ma, with a hiatus of unknown duration between the Hakatai Shale and Shinumo Quartzite.
