= Vishnu Basement Rocks =

Lithostratigraphic unit in the Grand Canyon, Arizona

- Stratigraphic range: Early Paleoproterozoic; ~1840–1660 Ma
- Type: Geological formation
- Sub-units: Granite Gorge Metamorphic Suite; Zoroaster Plutonic Complex
- Underlies: Unkar Group and, as part of the Great Unconformity, the Tapeats Sandstone
- Thickness: unknown

Lithology
- Primary: schist and granite
- Other: granodiorite, tonalite, pegmatite, and ultramafic rocks

Location
- Region: Arizona – (Grand Canyon)
- Country: United States

Type section
- Named for: Vishnu Temple (Grand Canyon) butte
- Named by: Charles Doolittle Walcott
- Year defined: 1894

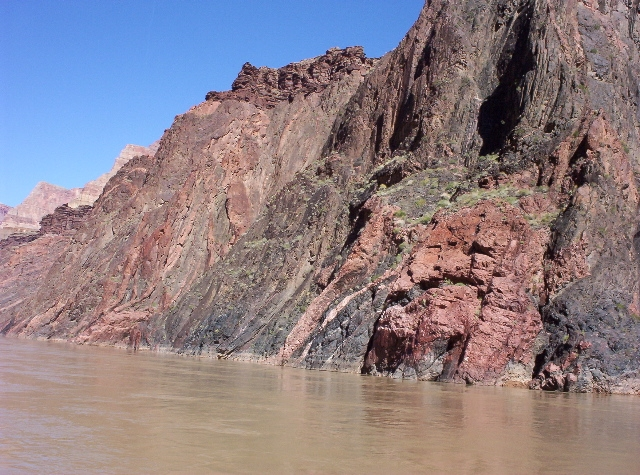
The Vishnu Basement Rocks were deposited as mafic and felsic volcanic rocks and sediments but were later metamorphosed and intruded by igneous rock.

The Vishnu Basement Rocks is the name recommended for all Early Proterozoic crystalline rocks (metamorphic and igneous) exposed in the Grand Canyon region. They form the crystalline basement rocks that underlie the Bass Limestone of the Unkar Group of the Grand Canyon Supergroup and the Tapeats Sandstone of the Tonto Group. These basement rocks have also been called the Vishnu Complex and Vishnu Metamorphic Complex. These Early Proterozoic crystalline rocks consist of metamorphic rocks that are collectively known as the Granite Gorge Metamorphic Suite; sections of the Vishnu Basement Rocks contain Early Paleoproterozoic granite, granitic pegmatite, aplite, and granodiorite that have intruded these metamorphic rocks, and also intrusive Early Paleoproterozoic ultramafic rocks.

The term Zoroaster Plutonic Complex is used for all Paleoproterozoic granitic and grandioritic plutonic rocks in the Grand Canyon. Specific names have been assigned to individual plutons and dike swarms because the plutons and swarms differ greatly in their age, origin, and tectonic significance. The oldest of these plutonic complexes, the Elves Chasm Gneiss, likely represents a small fragment of basement upon which the metavolcanic rocks that comprise the Granite Gorge Metamorphic Suite accumulated. The remainder of the Early Paleoproterozoic granites, granitic pegmatites, aplites, and granodiorites are parts of either younger plutons or dike swarms, that have intruded the Granite Gorge Metamorphic Suite, either contemporaneously with or after their metamorphosis.

It was named after a natural rock structure in the Colorado River valley which was named "Temple of Vishnu" from its appearance.

== Granite Gorge Metamorphic Suite ==
The Granite Gorge Metamorphic Suite consists of lithologic units, the Brahma, Rama, and Vishnu schists, that have been mapped within the Upper, Middle, and Lower Granite Gorges of the Grand Canyon. The Vishnu Schist consists of quartz-mica schist, pelitic schist, and meta-arenites. They exhibit relict sedimentary structures and textures that demonstrate that they are metamorphosed submarine sedimentary rocks. The Brahma Schist consists of amphibolite, hornblende-biotite-plagioclase schist, biotite-plagioclase schist, orthoamphibole-bearing schist and gneiss, and metamorphosed sulfide deposits. As inferred from relict structures and textures, the Brahma Schist is composed of mafic to felsic-composition metavolcanic rocks. The Rama Schist consists of massive, fine-grained quartzofeldspathic schist and gneiss that are probable felsic metavolcanic rocks. On the basis of the presence of relict pillow structures, interlayering of metavolcanic strata, and the large volumes of metavolcanic rocks, the Brahma and Rama schists are interpreted to consist of metamorphosed, volcanic island-arc and associated submarine volcanic rocks. These metavolcanic rocks are locally overlain by the metamorphosed submarine sedimentary rocks of the Vishnu Schist that are interpreted to have accumulated in oceanic trenches. These metasedimentary rocks were originally composed of particles of quartz, clay, and volcanic rock fragments that have become metamorphosed into various schists. The Vishnu Schist exhibits relict graded bedding and structures indicative of turbidite deposits that accumulated in oceanic trenches and other relatively deep-marine settings. The Brahma Schist has been dated to about 1.75 billion years ago. The felsic metavolcanic rocks that comprise the Rama Schist have yielded an age of 1.742 billion years ago.

== Early Paleoproterozoic basement ==
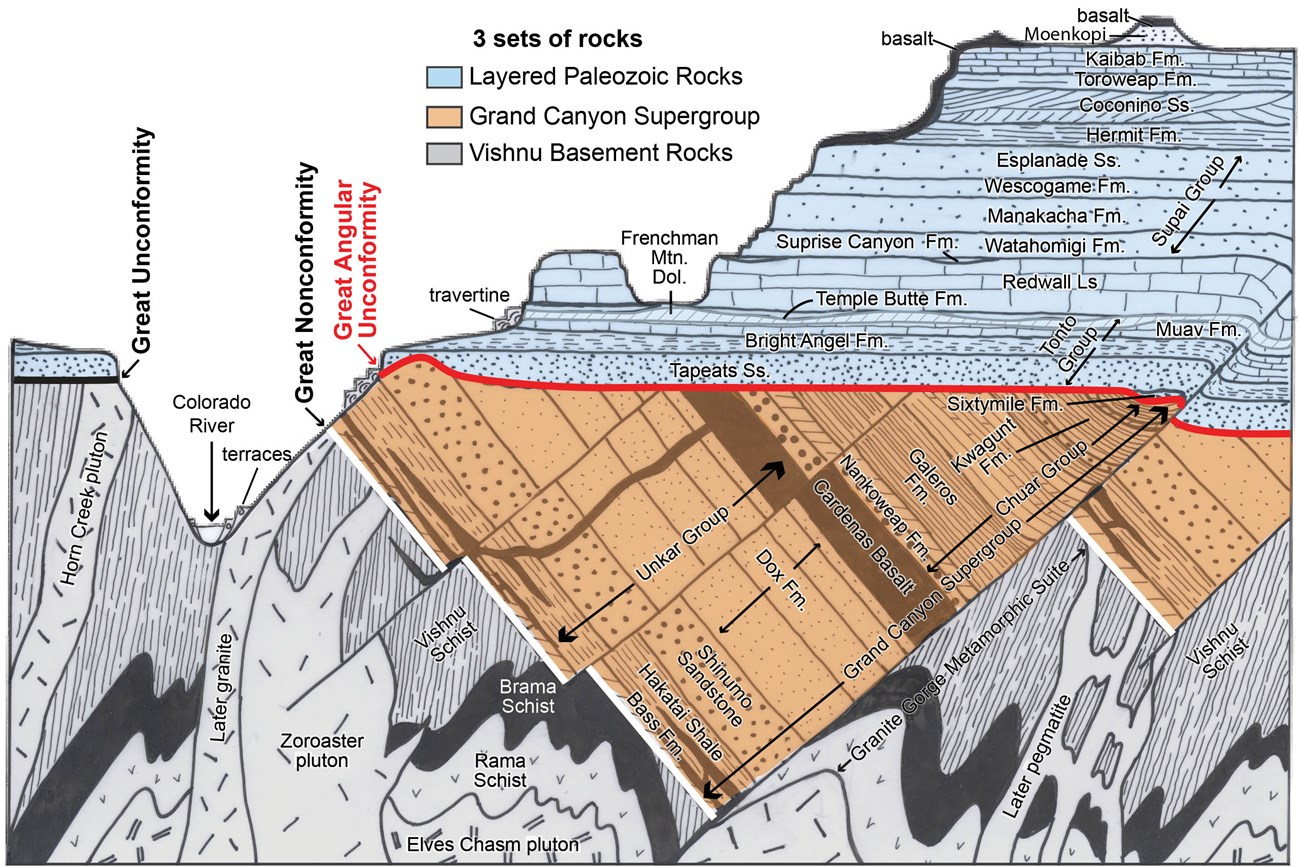
Figure 1. A geologic cross section of the Grand Canyon.

The oldest rocks that are part of the Vishnu Basement Rocks is the Elves Chasm pluton. It consists of metamorphosed mafic (hornblende-biotite tonalite) and intermediate-composition plutonic rocks (quartz diorite). Within it, there are tabular amphibolite bodies that might be dikes, that have been dated at about 1.84 billion years ago. It is regarded to be an older granodioritic pluton that was exposed by erosion prior to being buried by the original volcanic and submarine sedimentary rocks of the Granite Gorge Metamorphic Suite. The Elves Chasm pluton is likely part of the basement rocks on which the original volcanic rocks and sediments of the Granite Gorge Metamorphic Suite were deposited.

The highly tectonized contact between Elves Chasm pluton and the Granite Gorge Metamorphic Suite is exposed near Waltenberg Canyon, in 115-Mile Canyon, near Blacktail Canyon, and in the Middle Granite Gorge. This contact is characterized by a high-grade orthoamphibole-bearing gneiss. This gneiss is interpreted to be a highly metamorphosed and sheared paleosol and associated regolith that originally consisted of several meters of weathered rock debris eroded from older plutonic rocks.

== Younger intrusive igneous rocks ==
On the basis of rock type, type of intrusion, chemistry, and age of rocks, two main groups of younger Early Paleoproterozoic igneous intrusive (plutonic) rocks have been distinguished within the Vishnu Basement Rocks. One group, which dates between 1.74 and 1.71 billion years ago, consists of large plutons such as the Zoroaster pluton, the Ruby pluton, and the Diamond Creek pluton. There is no noticeable baking and metamorphism of the country rock adjacent to them. Because of this, they were likely shallowly emplaced beneath the volcanic arc in which the metavolcanics and metasediments of the Granite Gorge Metamorphic Suite accumulated. In addition, these intrusive rocks have undergone all the deformation that has also affected their adjacent country rock. This further indicates that they are just slightly younger than the metavolcanic and metasedimentary rocks they intrude. This and their calc-alkaline granitic composition, which is similar to plutons forming in modern subduction-zone-related volcanic arcs, indicates that they are remnants of early volcanic arc systems associated with Early Paleoproterozoic subduction zones. Comparable volcanic arc systems, which are associated with subduction zones, are active today in the Aleutian Islands and Indonesia (e.g., Sumatra and Java).

The second group of younger Early Paleoproterozoic igneous intrusive rocks is quite different in style, age, and significance. These igneous intrusive rocks consist of granitic and pegmatitic dike swarms, i.e. the Cottonwood, Cremation, Sapphire, and Garnet pegmatite complexes, that cut the Granite Gorge Metamorphic Suite from east to west. They formed as granite magma, and related pegmatite fluids, filled crack-systems as magma migrated through the crust. The chemical composition of the granite and pegmatite comprising these dike swarms is indicative of the partial melting of the metasedimentary and metavolcanic rocks of the Granite Gorge Metamorphic Suite both in-place and at greater depth in the crust. These dikes exhibit a wide variability in the degree that they have been deformed from straight and nearly undeformed – to varying degrees of folding, stretching, and shearing. The variable degree of the deformation of these structures is interpreted to indicate that these dike swarms were emplaced during a period of significant mountain building and crustal thickening that was possibly associated with continental collision.

== Ultramafic rocks ==
Also present within the Vishnu Basement Rocks are thin, discontinuous, and unnamed lenses of ultramafic rocks. They are found in several places within the Inner Gorge, such as at River Miles 81, 83, and 91, Salt Creek, Granite Park, and Diamond Creek. These ultramafic rocks occur typically as tectonic fault-bounded slivers, which are often associated with tectonic shear zones and exhibit coarse-grained relict cumulate textures. These rocks are interpreted to be the tectonically dismembered parts of the bases of large 1.74-to-1.71-billion-years-old plutons that have intruded the Granite Gorge Metamorphic Suite. This interpretation is based upon the abundance of phlogopite and geochemistry of light rare-earth elements that imply a geochemical contribution from subducting slab material. The composition of these ultramafic rocks is consistent with their origin by simple fractional crystallization within a pluton.

== Upper contact ==
The upper contact of the Vishnu Basement Rocks is a major unconformity between it and either the Tonto Group or Unkar Group that resulted from uplift and the deep erosion, by at least 25 km (16 mi), of the Vishnu Basement Rocks and any overlying strata. In the case of the unconformity between the Vishnu Basement Rocks and the Unkar Group, studies of the underlying Vishnu Basement Rocks indicate they were uplifted from a depth of about 25 km (16 mi) to a depth of about 10 km (6.2 mi), between 1.75 and 1.66 billion years ago, and from a depth of about 10 km (6.2 mi) to the weathered surface on which the Bass Formation of the Unkar Group accumulated, between 1.66 and 1.25 billion years ago.

== See also ==
- Geology of the Grand Canyon area
- Great Unconformity
