= Chuar Group =

Part of the geologic Grand Canyon Supergroup

- Stratigraphic range: Neoproterozoic, 782 to 739 Ma
- Type: Geological formation
- Unit of: Grand Canyon Supergroup
- Sub-units: Kwagunt Formation; Galeros Formation
- Underlies: Sixtymile Formation and, as part of the Great Unconformity, the Tapeats Sandstone
- Overlies: Nankoweap Formation
- Thickness: 1,600 m (5,200 ft) at maximum

Lithology
- Primary: mudstone
- Other: dolomite and sandstone

Location
- Region: Arizona, Utah
- Country: United States

Type section
- Named for: Chuar Canyon
- Named by: Walcott (1894) and Noble (1910, 1914)

The Neoproterozoic Chuar Group consists of 1,600 m (5,200 ft) of exceptionally well-preserved, unmetamorphosed sedimentary strata that is composed of about 85% mudrock. The Group is the approximate upper half of the Grand Canyon Supergroup, overlain by the thin, in comparison, Sixtymile Formation, the top member of the multi-membered Grand Canyon Supergroup. The outcrop of the Chuar Group strata is limited to exposures along the western bank of the Colorado River in a 150 km^{2} (58 sq mi) area of the eastern Grand Canyon, Arizona. The strata of the Chuar Group have been subdivided into the Galeros Formation (lower) and the Kwagunt Formation (upper) using the base of the prominent, thick sandstone unit.

== Description ==
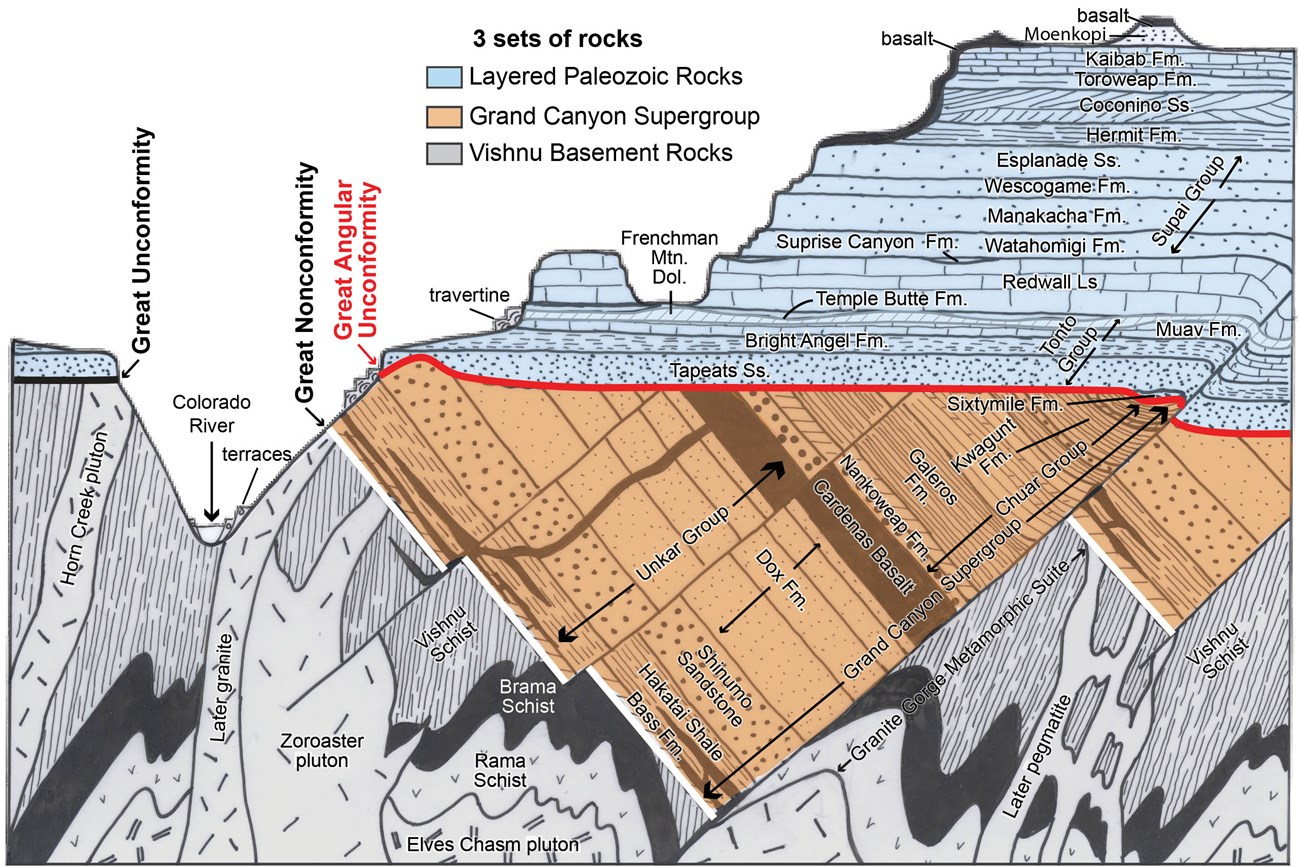
Figure 1. A geologic cross section of the Grand Canyon.

The Galeros Formation consists of a series of meter-scale sedimentary cycles composed of interbedded mudrocks, siltstones, and sandstones, frequently capped by dolomite beds. These strata have been subdivided, in ascending order, into the Tanner, Jupiter, Carbon Canyon, and Duppa members. Dolomite is dominate in all of these members. Thick (meter-scale) basal dolomite beds define the Tanner and Jupiter members. In case of the Jupiter Member, the basal dolomite bed is stromatolitic. The Carbon Canyon Member contains stromatolite bioherms.

The Kwagunt Formation is composed of sandstones, siltstones, shales, carbonates, cherts, and ironstones. These strata have been subdivided, in ascending order, into the Carbon Butte, Awatubi, and Walcott members. The Carbon Butte Member consists largely of sandstone interbedded with carbonates and, locally, ironstones. The Awatubi Member consists of a distinctive zone of stromatolitic bioherms at its base overlain by grey, green, and black organic-rich siltstones and shales, some of which contain marcasite nodules. The base of the Walcott Member consists of a distinctive meter-scale laminated dolomite bed (the Flakey dolomite). The Flakey dolomite is overlain by silicified oolites, chert beds, black shales. A pair of meter-scale dolomite beds (upper and lower dolomite couple) occur in the upper Walcott along with early diagenetic dolomite nodules up to 1 m (3.3 ft) in diameter.

The mudrocks of the Galeros and Kwagunt formations are normally interbedded with meter-thick sandstone and dolomite beds. The mudrocks are typically gray to black when freshly exposed and weather to reddish or greenish colors. The fresh gray to black colors of the mudrocks are due to a high organic content. Some samples of these mudrocks contain high total organic carbon percentages that are as much 9.39 weight percent organic carbon. The sandstone beds often exhibit symmetrical ripple marks. These ripple marks are commonly draped with a thin veneer of mudstone with mudcracks.

== Fossils ==
The Chuar Group contains a variety of Neoproterozoic fossils. The dolomite beds contain at least six different types of stromatolites and microbially induced sedimentary structures. The gray and black mudrocks of the Duppa, Carbon Canyon, Jupiter, and Tanner members of the Chuar Group often contain organic-walled microfossils, including filaments, colonial forms, and both smooth-walled and ornamented vesicles. A morphological group of organic microfossil, called vase-shaped microfossils, occur within the Walcott and Awatubi members of the Kwagunt Formation along with the enigmatic, circular, macroscopic, organic-walled fossil Tawuia (Churnia circularis), and phosphatic scale microfossils. The vase-shaped microfossils are likely presentatives of either arcellinid testate amoebae, acritarchs, or some of both. Finally, organic chemicals, biomarkers, characteristic of dinoflagellates have been reported.

== Age ==
The age of the Chuar Group is well constrained between as being 729 and 782 Ma by Re-Os and U-Pb ages. First, U–Pb dating of detrital zircons from basal beds of the underlying Nankoweap Formation indicates it to be less than 782 Ma. Second, Re–Os ages from organic-rich carbonates in the upper Galeros Formation and marcasite nodules in the lower Kwagunt Formation yielded ages of 757.0 ± 6.8 and 751.0 ± 7.6 Ma, respectively. Finally, an U–Pb age obtained from CA-ID-TIMS analysis of zircons recovered from a tuff at the top of the Walcott Member is 729.0 ± 0.9 Ma. These ages also indicate that the vase-shaped microfossils-bearing Walcott Member is between 751 and 729 Ma.

== Depositional Setting ==
The types of fossils found and sedimentary strata comprising the Chuar Group are indicative of its deposition within a low-energy marine embayment. During the deposition of the Chuar Group, this embayment was influenced by tidal and wave processes, infrequent large storms, microbial activity and carbonate precipitation, and the accumulation of mud and organic matter in quiet water. The sediments and fossils suggest that the Chuar Group accumulated in relatively shallow water (tens of meters or less), possibly, with times of intermittent exposure on a tidal flat.

== See also ==
- Geology of the Grand Canyon area

== Popular Publications ==
- Blakey, Ron and Wayne Ranney, Ancient Landscapes of the Colorado Plateau, Grand Canyon Association (publisher), 2008, 176 pages, ISBN 978-1934656037
- Chronic, Halka. Roadside Geology of Arizona, Mountain Press Publishing Co., 1983, 23rd printing, pp. 229–232, ISBN 978-0-87842-147-3
- Keller, B.; 2012; Overview of the Grand Canyon Supergroup; Grand Hikes; accessed .
- Lucchitta, Ivo, Hiking Arizona's Geology, 2001, Mountaineers's Books, ISBN 0-89886-730-4
