= Tapeats Sandstone =

Cambrian geologic formation found in the Southwestern United States

- Stratigraphic range: Middle Cambrian; 508–507 Ma
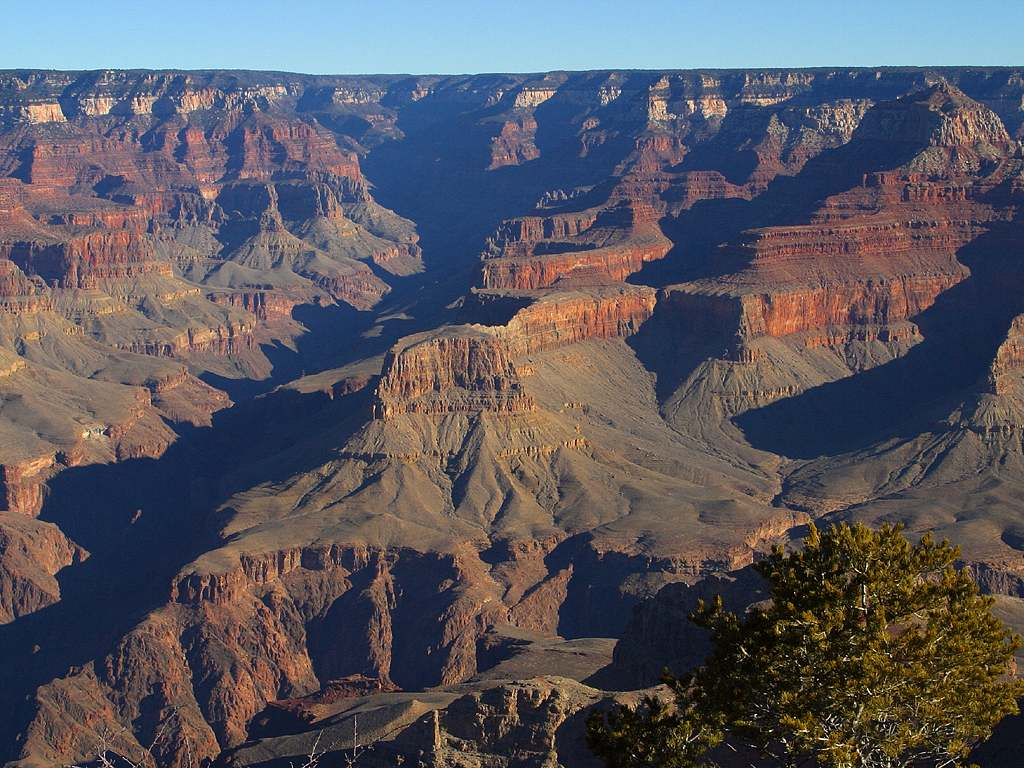
- Muav Limestone-(greenish, slope-forming) and Bright Angel Shale, resting on Tapeats and the Tonto Platform, inner canyon, Granite Gorge (the two units are easily seen below the red-stained Redwall Limestone) (220 m (720 ft) thick)
- Type: Geological formation
- Unit of: Tonto Group
- Underlies: Bright Angel Shale
- Overlies: Vishnu Basement Rocks, Unkar Group, Nankoweap Formation, Chuar Group, and Sixtymile Formation
- Thickness: 70 m (230 ft)

Lithology
- Primary: sandstone and conglomerate
- Other: conglomeratic sandstone

Location
- Region: northern Arizona (Grand Canyon), central Arizona, southeast California, southern Nevada, and southeast Utah
- Country: United States of America

Type section
- Named for: Tapeats Creek
- Named by: Noble (1914)

Except where underlain by the Sixtymile Formation, the Tapeats Sandstone is the Cambrian geologic formation that is the basal geologic unit of the Tonto Group. Typically, it is also the basal geologic formation of the Phanerozoic strata exposed in the Grand Canyon, Arizona, and parts of northern Arizona, central Arizona, southeast California, southern Nevada, and southeast Utah. The Tapeats Sandstone is about 70 m (230 ft) thick, at its maximum. The lower and middle sandstone beds of the Tapeats Sandstone are well-cemented, resistant to erosion, and form brownish, vertical cliffs that rise above the underlying Precambrian strata outcropping within Granite Gorge (Inner Gorge). They form the edge of the Tonto Platform. The upper beds of the Tapeats Sandstone form the surface of the Tonto Platform. The overlying soft shales and siltstones of the Bright Angel Shale underlie drab-greenish slopes that rise from the Tonto Platform to cliffs formed by limestones of the Muav Limestone and dolomites of the Frenchman Mountain Dolostone.

== Nomenclature ==
In 1875, G. K. Gilbert recognized that strata similar to those, named the Tonto Group, found in the Tonto Basin are exposed near the bottom of parts of the Grand Canyon. Based upon this similarity, he also assigned these strata to the Tonto Group. From youngest to oldest, Gilbert further subdivided the Tonto Group into three subunits, the Marbled limestone, the Tonto shale, and the Tonto sandstone. However, he did not specify a specific type locality for any of these stratigraphic units.

In 1914, L F. Noble officially redefined and renamed Gilbert's subdivisions of the Tonto Group. He renamed the Tonto sandstone as the Tapeats Sandstone and the Tonto shale as the Bright Angel Shale. He named the Tapeats Sandstone after Tapeats Creek in which this sandstone is exposed in the creek's bed. Later in 1922, Noble renamed the Marbled limestone as the Muav Limestone. According to Noble's definition, the Muav Limestone consisted of an upper set of dolomite beds and a lower set of limestone beds. The Muav Limestone is now applied only to Noble's lower set of limestone beds and the upper set of dolomite beds now constitutes the Frenchman Mountain Dolostone. E. D. McKee and C. E. Resser and subsequent researchers retained Noble's usage for this formation despite infrequent misgivings about their stratigraphic complexity.

== Description ==
In the Grand Canyon, the Tapeats Sandstone is a medium- to coarse-grained, thin-bedded, cliff-forming and locally conglomeratic sandstone that weathers to a tan or reddish-brown. In its outcrops within the eastern part of the Grand Canyon, the Tapeats Sandstone is commonly divided into two layers. The lower portion of it consists of a lower layer of sandstone that outcrops as a cliff-forming cliff consisting of beds that are each typically less than 0.9 m (3.0 ft)thick. The beds exhibit sedimentary structures that include planar and trough cross-bedding and crudely developed horizontal bedding. Typically, the thickness of the bedding and cross-bedding decreases upwards in an outcrop. In paleotopographic lows along the Great Unconformity, the lower layer often has at its base a few beds composed of conglomeratic quartz and feldspar. The composition of these conglomeratic beds typically reflects the lithology of the underlying, local Precambrian basement rocks. Overlying the cliff-forming layer, is a thinner layer, known as the transitional beds, that consists of interbedded fine- to medium-grained sandstone and mudstone. The bedding in this upper layer is thinner than below and they exhibit largely trough and ripple cross stratification and horizontal lamination. The transitional beds grade upward into and interfinger with the overlying Bright Angel Shale. They form the surface of the Tonto Platform. In the western part of the Grand Canyon, a mudstone-rich layer often occurs sandwiched between these sandstone layers.

The thickness of the Tapeats Sandstone exposed within the Grand Canyon varies from very thin to absent where it accumulated over prominent paleotopographic highs of the Great Unconformity to as thick as 90 m (300 ft) thick within paleotopographic lows. Where it is thickest, the upper 12 to 15 m (39 to 49 ft) belong to the transition beds underlying the Bright Angel Shale.

== Lower Contact ==
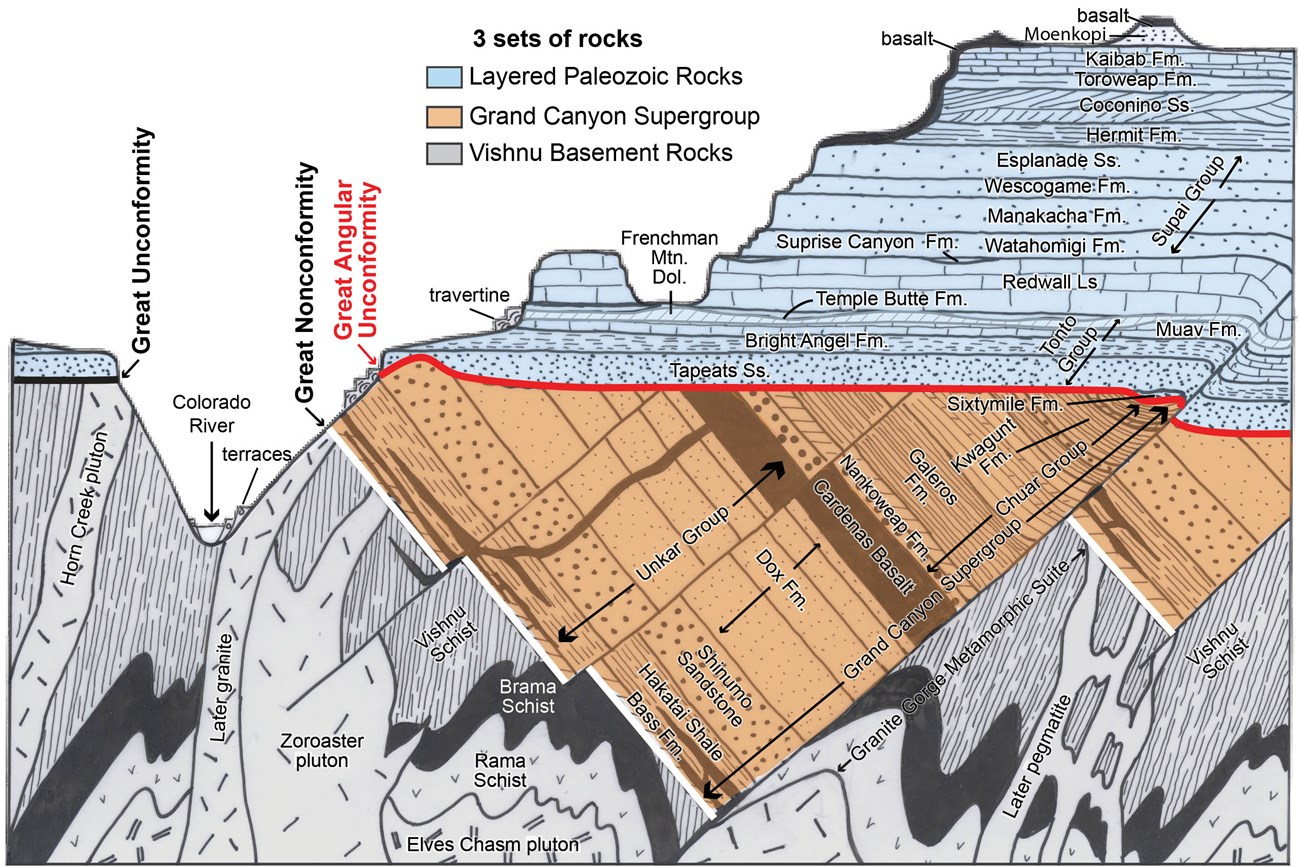
Figure 1. A geologic cross section of the Grand Canyon.

Throughout the majority of its extent, the Tapeats Sandstone lies unconformably on the surface of underlying Precambrian rocks forming the Great Unconformity. Where the Sixtymile Formation underlies the Tapeats Sandstone, the Great Unconformity lies at the base of the Sixtymile Formation. This unconformity is either an angular unconformity truncating tilted strata of the Grand Canyon Supergroup or a nonconformity with the Vishnu Basement Rocks and other Precambrian metamorphic or plutonic rocks. Within the eastern Grand Canyon, the Tapeats Sandstone is separated from the underlying Precambrian rocks by the Cambrian Sixtymile Formation.

In the eastern Grand Canyon, the Tapeats Sandstone unconformably overlies a hilly and weathered paleosurface underlain by the Grand Canyon Group and Vishnu Basement Rocks. In one basin, the Cambrian Sixtymile Formation is preserved in a synclinal paleotopographic low in the Great Unconformity and separates the Tapeats Sandstone from it and the Grand Canyon Supergroup. The highest paleomonadnocks on this paleosurface are composed of Shinumo Quartzite and other erosion resistant strata of the Grand Canyon Group form paleocuestas of lesser and intermediate height.

In the western Grand Canyon, the Tapeats Sandstone unconformably overlies a similar hilly and weathered paleosurface underlain by the Vishnu Basement Rocks. This paleosurface is quite irregular and was before burial a rolling paleotopography of resistant crystalline basement hills rising above the surrounding lowlands. The relief on the Great Unconformity in the Grand Canyon represents ancient valleys and hills that influenced sedimentation patterns within the Tapeats Sandstone along with the local basement lithology. For example, there are numerous places where the Tapeats Sandstone thins across or terminates against ancient crystalline basement highs. Where the Tapeats Sandstone is absent, the Bright Angel Shale directly overlies the Great Unconformity.

Throughout the Grand Canyon area, the Precambrian bedrock underlying the Tapeats Sandstone and Great Unconformity was extensively weathered and eroded during prolonged periods of subaerial exposure. Last studied by Sharp in 1940, a highly altered ancient weathering horizon is locally preserved within the Precambrian rocks immediately underlying the Tapeats Sandstone. He concluded that extensive chemical weathering, which occurred prior to deposition of the Tapeats Sandstone, of exposed Precambrian rocks created a highly weathered bedrock, or regolith, as much as 15 m (49 ft) thick. Generally, this regolith is less than 30 m (98 ft) thick having been likely partially eroded and redeposited as Tapeats Sandstone. Where the Tapeats Sandstone rests on unaltered Precambrian basement, the regolith probably was removed by erosion either prior to or during the initial deposition of the Tapeats Sandstone.

== Fossils ==
Despite the abundance of invertebrate burrows and trails (trace fossils) found in the Tapeats Sandstone, the body fossils of invertebrates, such as brachiopods and trilobites are absent, except where it interfingers with the overlying Bright Angel Shale. As summarized by Lassiter and others 13 invertebrate taxa are reported as having been found in the Tapeats Sandstone. However, because of the gradational and interfingering natural of Tapeats Sandstone with the Bright Angel Shale and uncertainties in locations of collecting sites, at least some of these taxa are probably collected from the Bright Angel Shale instead. The arthropods include the trilobites, Olenellus and Spencella and the marine arthropods, Indianites and Walcottella. The brachiopods recorded from the Tapeats Sandstone include five species of the lingulate genus Lingula and two species of paterinate brachiopods, An unidentified species of obolellid brachiopod has been reported from the Tapeats Sandstone but remains unverified.

The Tapeats Sandstone, especially its transitional beds, are often bioturbated and contains a wide variety of trace fossils. These trace fossils commonly consist of ubiquitous vertical burrows and a large variety of horizontal tracks and trails. Many of the vertical burrows were most likely created by annelid worms and other soft bodied animals. The horizontal tracks and trails were likely created by gastropods and as well as arthropods (trilobites and crustaceans).

== Depositional Environment ==
The Tapeats Sandstone consists of a mixture shallow marine, intertidal, and coastal plain deposits associated with an eastward advancing shoreline. The upper transitional beds represent sediment deposited on a deepening shallow-marine shelf. These shallow marine deposits overlie intertidal deposits reworked from braided fluvial and deltaic sediments deposited in front of an eastward advancing shoreline. Together, the Tapeats Sandstone, Bright Angel Shale, and Muav Limestone form a typical transgressive sedimentary sequence.

In 2018, Karlstrom and others studied the age of detrital zircons from the Tapeats Sandstone in the Grand Canyon and southern Nevada using U-Pb dating. They interpreted the results of this study to indicate that the maximum depositional age of the Tapeats Sandstone to be from 505.4 ± 8 Ma to 501.4 ± 3.8 Ma and that it accumulated as an ancient shoreline gradually migrated eastward during the Cambrian Epoch 3.

== Tonto Platform ==
The flat lying Tonto Platform has hiking trails that cross it from the South Rim to North Rim, Grand Canyon for instance. The extensive Tonto Trail lies on parts of the Tapeats Sandstone, and the platform on the south side of Granite Gorge.

== Gallery Tapeats Sandstone ==
Examples of the Great Unconformity. The Tapeats approximately 200 ft thick.

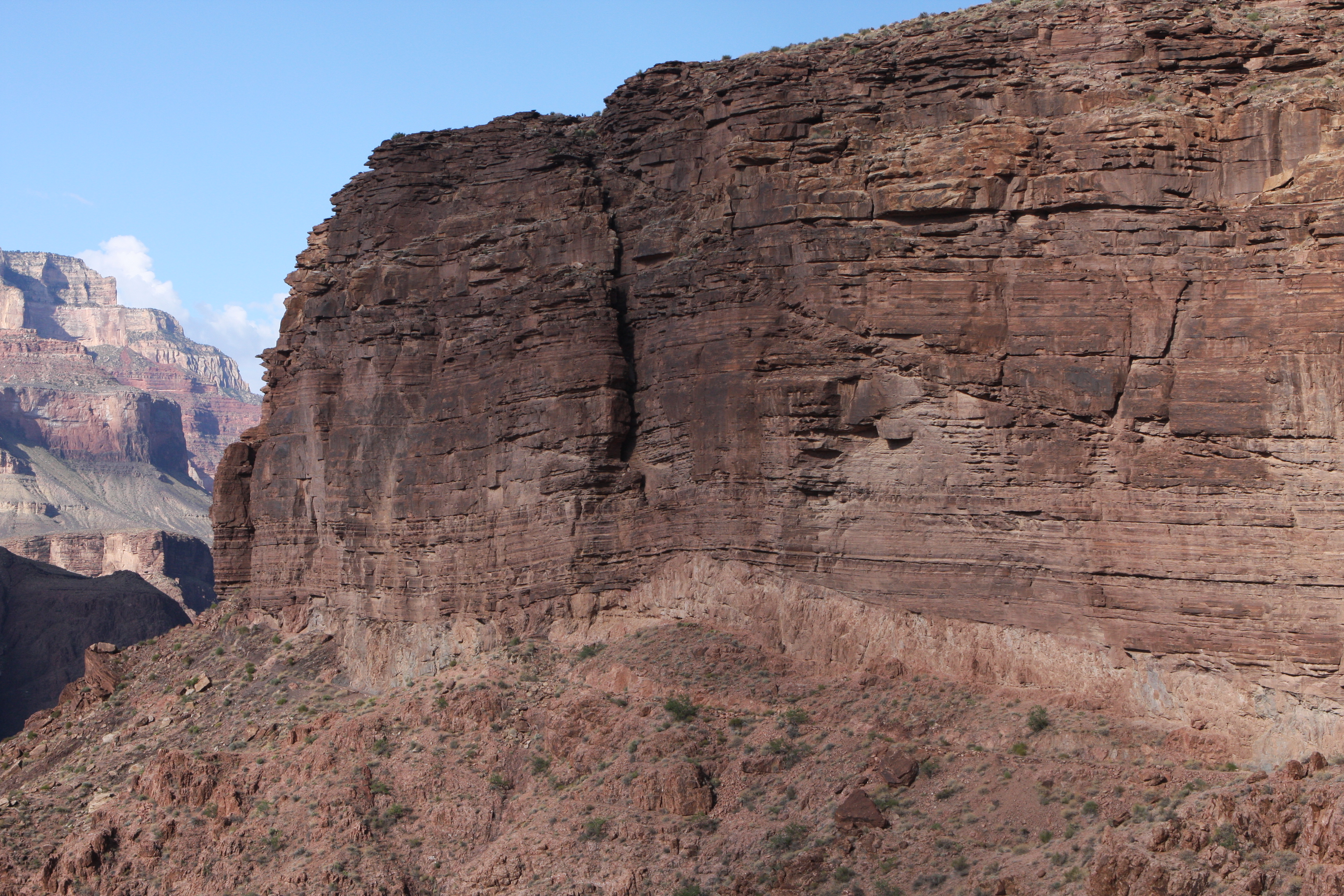
Tapeats Sandstone on the Great Unconformity on Vishnu Schist, covered by erosional layers masking the schist.

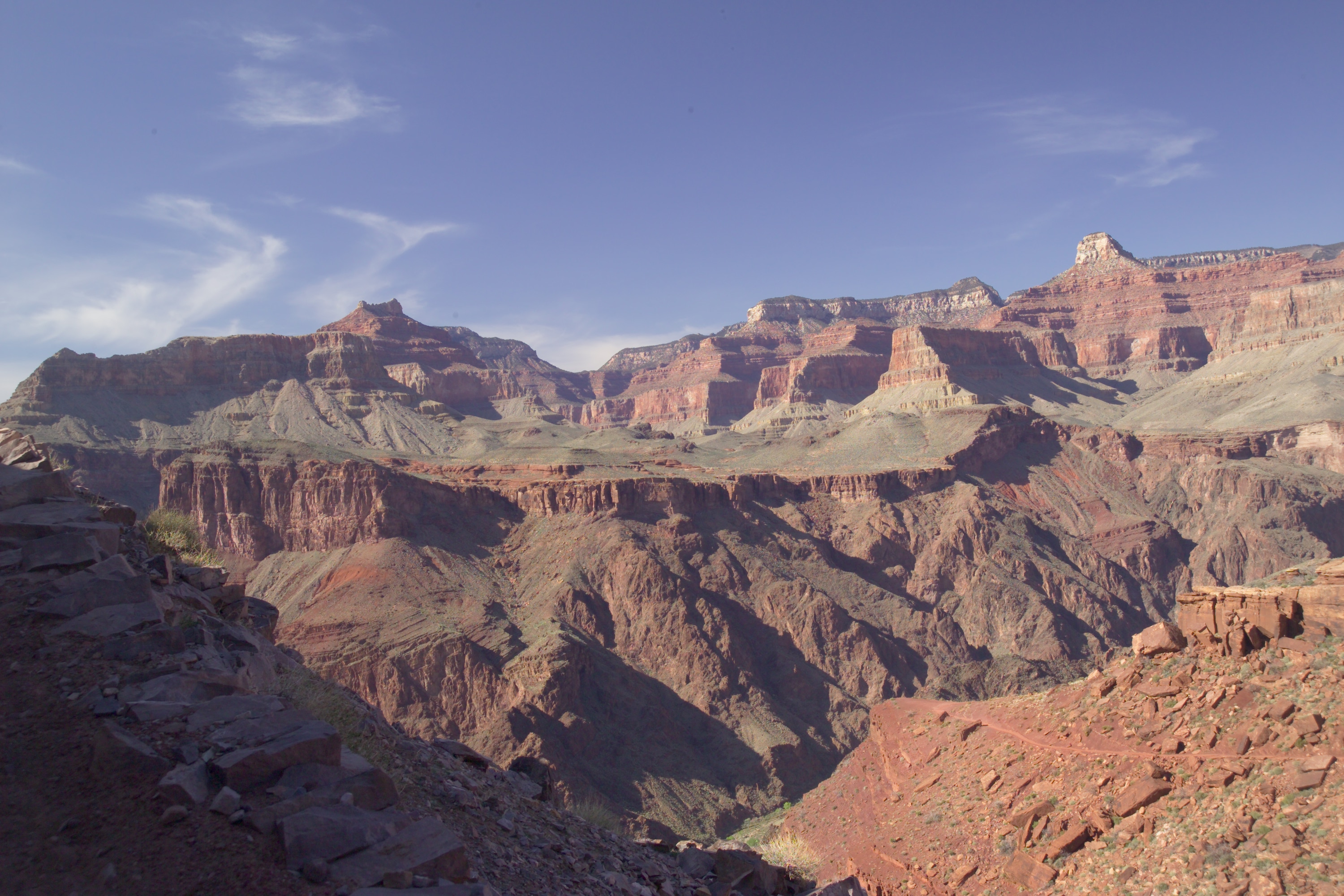
View of Tonto Group, in descending order: Muav Limestone, Bright Angel Shale, and Tapeats Sandstone, overlying the Great Unconformity cut into Vishnu Basement Rocks in Granite Gorge region.

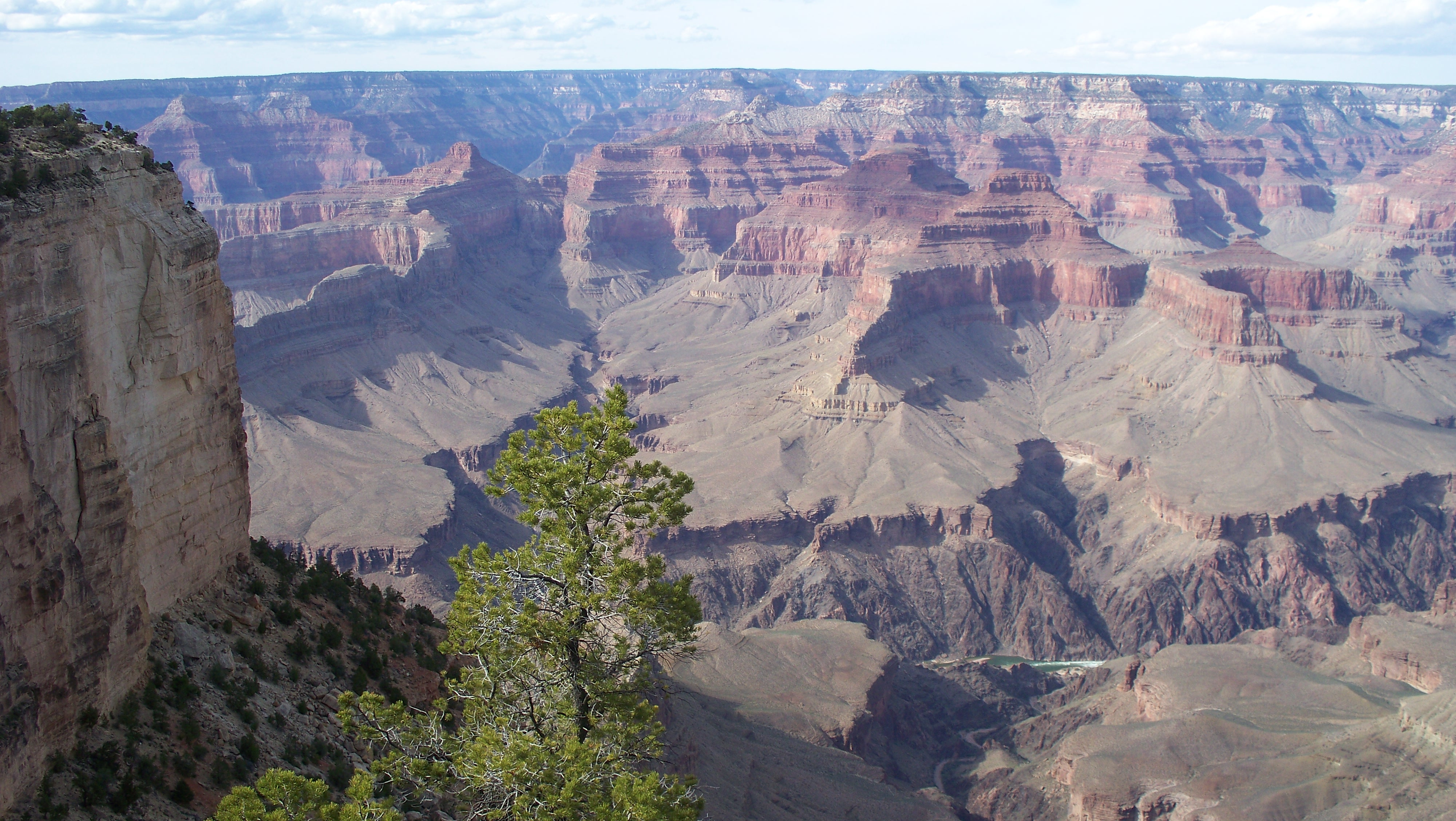
Another view of Tonto Group, in descending order: Muav Limestone, Bright Angel Shale, and Tapeats Sandstone, overlying the Great Unconformity cut into Vishnu Basement Rocks in Granite Gorge region.

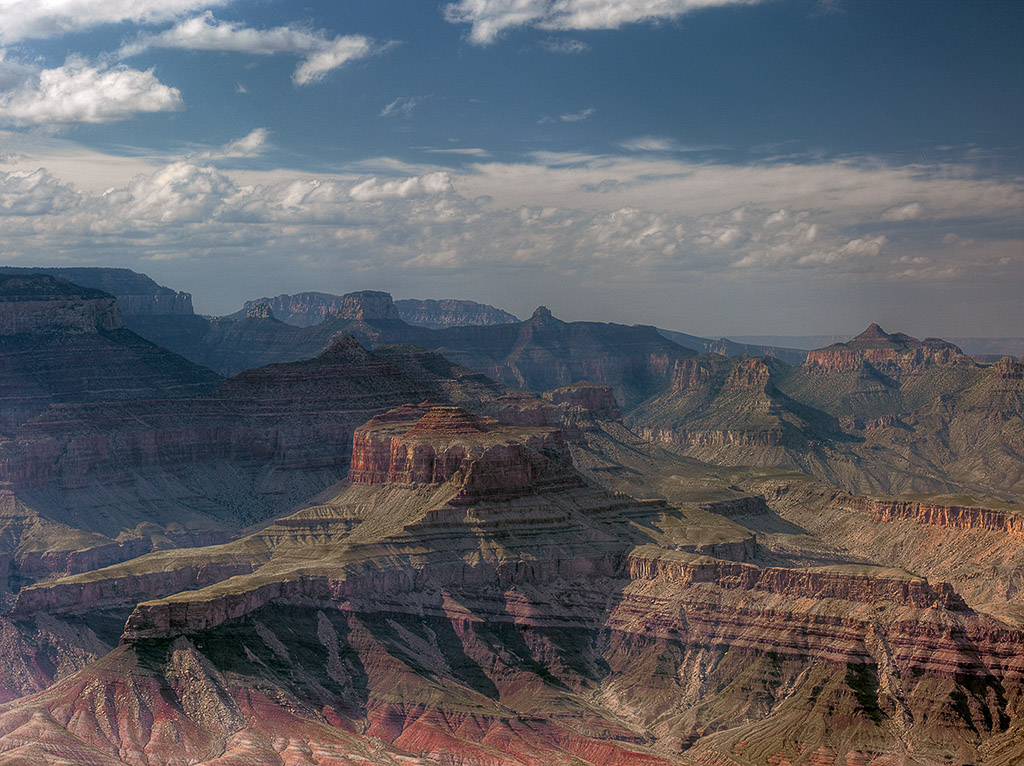
view opposite Lipan Point, (at Desert View (Grand Canyon), East Rim), showing the banded Nankoweap Formation, (horizontal Tapeats at left, extending at base of prominence, in two fingers of rock)

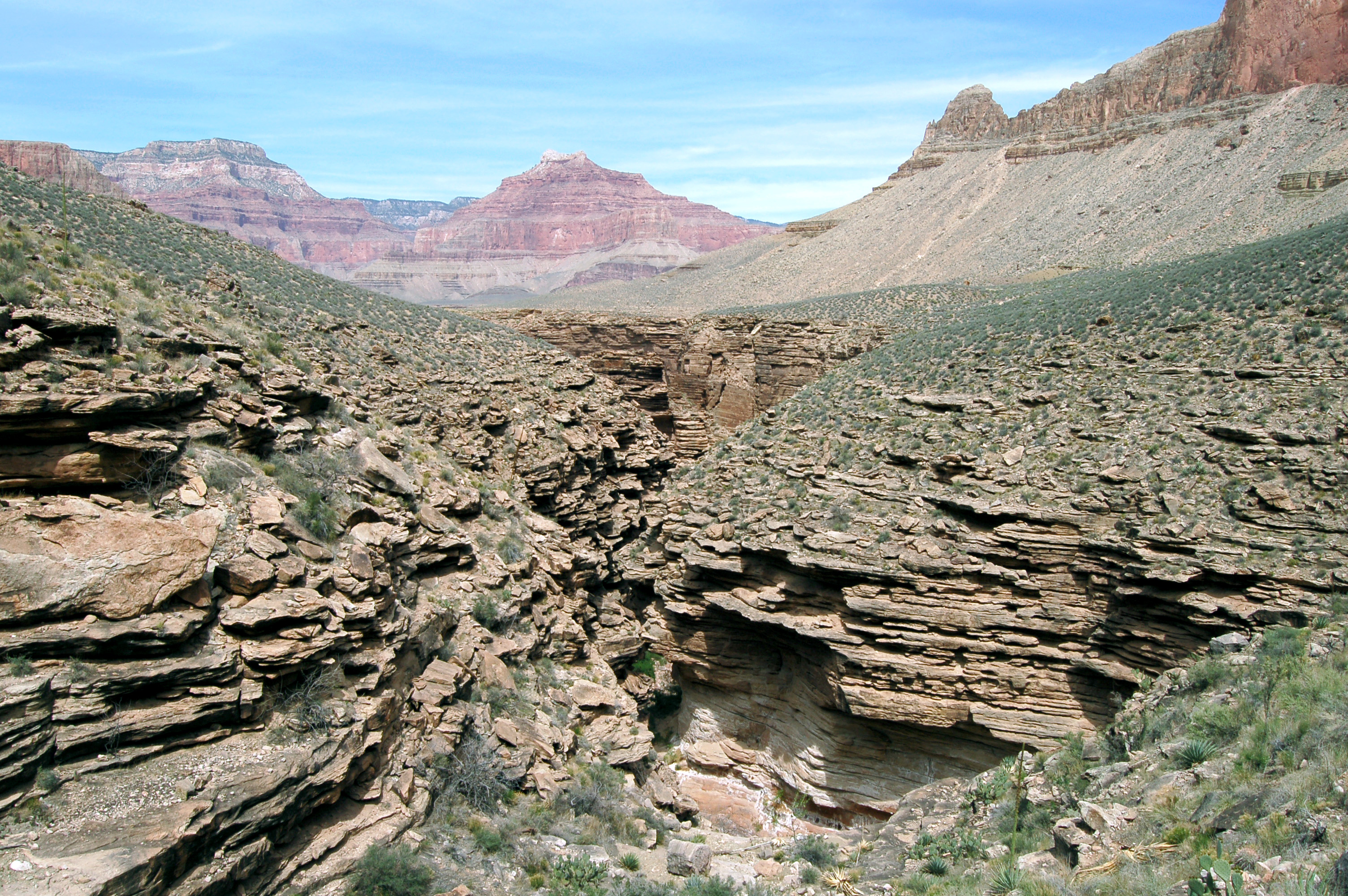
Tapeats Sandstone ledges in Salt Creek, Grand Canyon National Park

== See also ==
- Geology of the Grand Canyon area
- Sauk sequence
