= Geology of the Grand Canyon area =

Aspect of geology

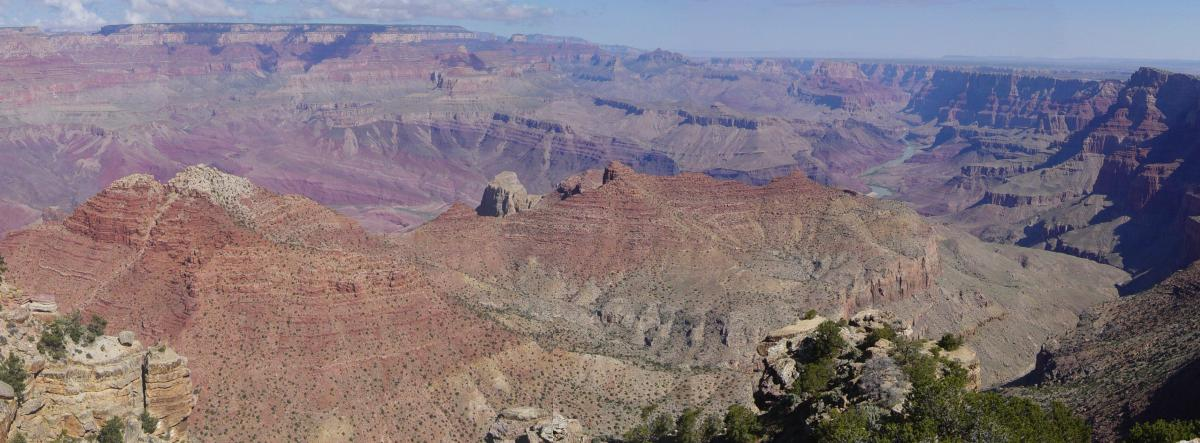
The Grand Canyon from Navajo Point. The Colorado River is to the right and the North Rim is visible at all in the distance. The view shows nearly every sedimentary layer described in this article.

The geology of the Grand Canyon area includes one of the most complete and studied sequences of rock on Earth. The nearly 40 major sedimentary rock layers exposed in the Grand Canyon and in the Grand Canyon National Park area range in age from about 200 million to nearly 2 billion years old. Most were deposited in warm, shallow seas and near ancient, long-gone sea shores in western North America. Both marine and terrestrial sediments are represented, including lithified sand dunes from an extinct desert. There are at least 14 known unconformities in the geologic record found in the Grand Canyon.

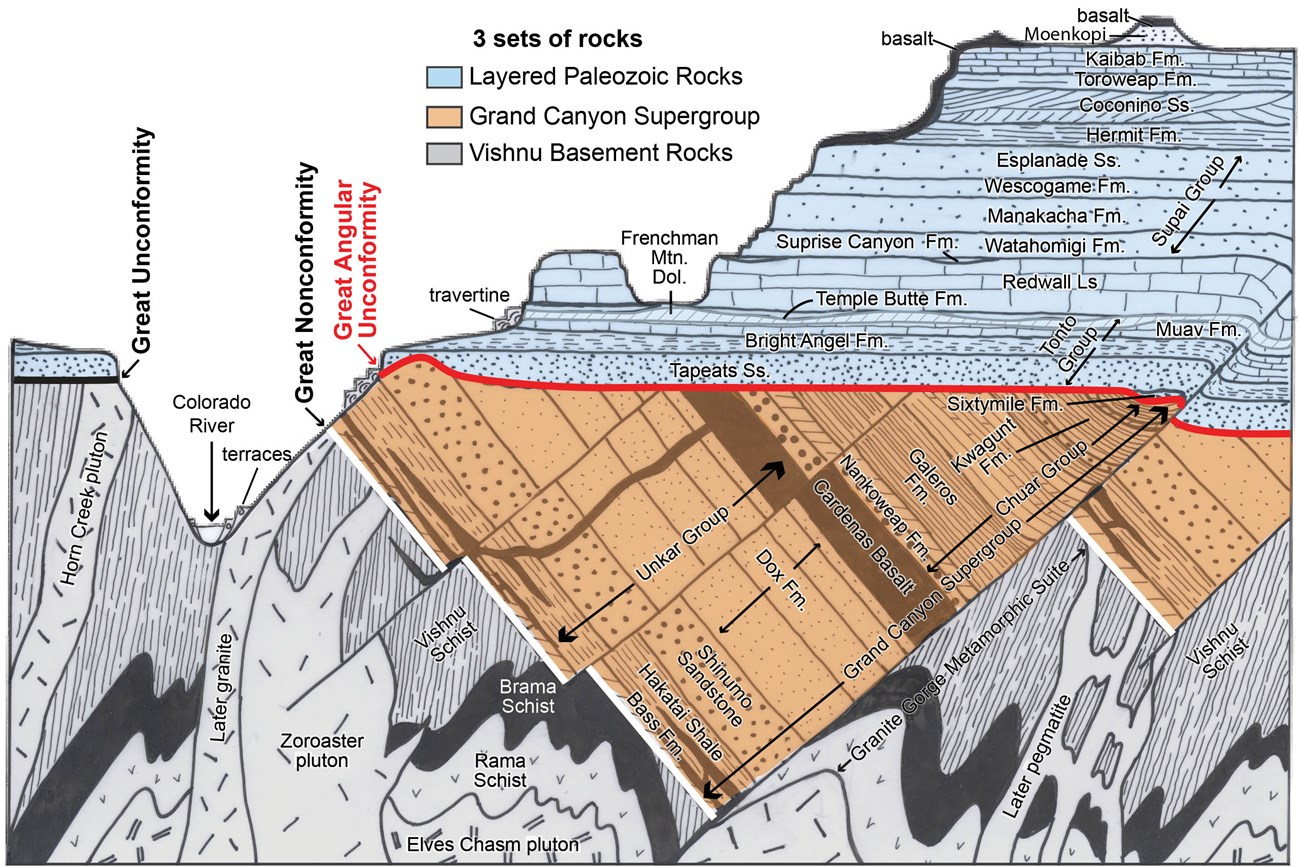
Figure 1. A geologic cross section of the Grand Canyon.

Uplift of the region started about 75 million years ago during the Laramide orogeny; a mountain-building event that is largely responsible for creating the Rocky Mountains to the east. In total, the Colorado Plateau was uplifted an estimated 2 miles (3.2 km). The adjacent Basin and Range Province to the west started to form about 18 million years ago as the result of crustal stretching. A drainage system that flowed through what is today the eastern Grand Canyon emptied into the now lower Basin and Range province. The opening of the Gulf of California around 6 million years ago enabled a large river to cut its way northeast from the gulf. The new river captured the older drainage to form the ancestral Colorado River, which in turn started to form the Grand Canyon.

Wetter climates brought upon by ice ages starting 2 million years ago greatly increased excavation of the Grand Canyon, which was nearly as deep as it is now, 1.2 million years ago. Volcanic activity deposited lava over the area 1.8 million to 500,000 years ago. At least 13 lava dams blocked the Colorado River, forming lakes that were up to 2,000 feet (610 m) deep. The end of the last ice age and subsequent human activity has greatly reduced the ability of the Colorado River to excavate the canyon. Dams in particular have upset patterns of sediment transport and deposition. Controlled floods from Glen Canyon Dam upstream have been conducted to see if they have a restorative effect. Earthquakes and mass-wasting erosive events still affect the region.

== Vishnu Basement Rocks ==
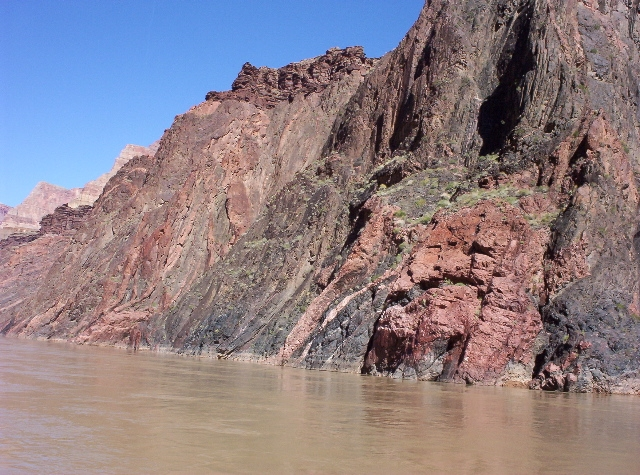
The Vishnu Basement Rocks were deposited as volcanic rocks and sediments but were later metamorphosed and intruded by igneous rock.

At about 2.5 and 1.8 billion years ago in Precambrian time, sand, mud, silt, and ash were laid down in a marine basin adjacent to an orogenic belt. From 1.8 to 1.6 billion years ago at least two island arcs collided with the proto-North American continent. This process of plate tectonics compressed and grafted the marine sediments in the basin onto the mainland and uplifted them out of the sea. Later, these rocks were buried 12 miles (19 km) under the surface and pressure-cooked into metamorphic rock. The resulting Granite Gorge Metamorphic Suite, which is part of the Vishnu Basement Rocks, consists of the metasedimentary Vishnu Schist and the metavolcanic Brahma and Rama Schists that were formed 1.75 billion to 1.73 billion years ago. This is the resistant rock now exposed at the bottom of the canyon in the Inner Gorge.

As the volcanic islands collided with the mainland around 1.7 billion years ago, blobs of magma rose from the subduction zone and intruded the Granite Gorge Metamorphic Suite. These plutons slowly cooled to form the Zoroaster Granite; part of which would later be metamorphosed into gneiss. This rock unit can be seen as light-colored bands in the darker garnet-studded Vishnu Schist (see 1b in figure 1). The collision expanded the continent from the Wyoming–Colorado border into Mexico and almost doubled the crust's thickness in the Grand Canyon region. Part of this thickening created the 5-to-6-mile (8 to 10 km) high ancestral Mazatzal Mountains.

Subsequent erosion lasting 300 million years stripped much of the exposed sediments and the mountains away. This reduced the very high mountains to small hills a few tens to hundreds of feet (tens of meters) high. Geologist John Wesley Powell called this major gap in the geologic record, which is also seen in other parts of the world, the Great Unconformity. Other sediments may have been added but, if they ever existed, were completely removed by erosion. Such gaps in the geologic record are called unconformities by geologists. The Great Unconformity is one of the best examples of an exposed nonconformity, which is a type of unconformity that has bedded rock units above igneous or metamorphic rocks.

== Grand Canyon Supergroup ==
In late Precambrian time, extension from a large tectonic plate or smaller plates moving away from Laurentia thinned its continental crust, forming large rift basins that would ultimately fail to split the continent. Eventually, this sunken region of Laurentia was flooded with a shallow seaway that extended from at least present-day Lake Superior to Glacier National Park in Montana to the Grand Canyon and the Uinta Mountains. The resulting Grand Canyon Supergroup of sedimentary units is composed of nine varied geologic formations that were laid down from 1.2 billion and 740 million years ago in this sea. Good exposures of the supergroup can be seen in eastern Grand Canyon in the Inner Gorge and from Desert View, Lipan Point and Moran point. (Note: A geologic formation is a rock unit that has one or more sediment beds, and a member is a minor unit in a formation. Groups are sets of formations that are related in significant ways, and a supergroup is a sequence of vertically related groups and lone formations.)

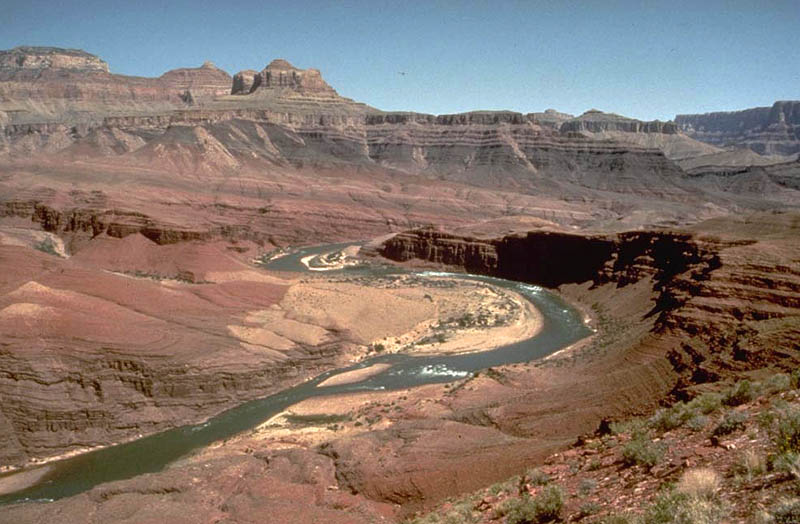
The Cardenas Basalt was laid on top of the rest of the Grand Canyon Supergroup

The oldest section of the supergroup is the Unkar Group. It accumulated in a variety of fluvial, deltaic, tidal, nearshore marine, and offshore marine environments. The first formation to be laid down in the Unkar Group was the Bass Formation. Fluvial gravels initially accumulated in shallow river valleys. They later lithified into a basal conglomerate that is known as the Hotauta Member of the Bass Formation. The Bass Formation was deposited in a shallow sea near the coast as a mix of limestone, sandstone, and shale. Diagenesis later altered the bulk of the limestone into dolomite. It is 120 to 340 feet (37 to 100 m) thick and grayish in color. Averaging 1250 million years old, this is the oldest layer exposed in the Grand Canyon that contains fossils—stromatolites. Hakatai Shale is made of thin beds of marginal-marine-derived mudstones, sandstones, and shale that, together, are 445 to 985 feet (136 to 300 m) thick. This formation indicates a short-lived regression (retreat) of the seashore in the area that left mud flats. Today it is very bright orange-red and gives the Red Canyon its name. Shinumo Quartzite is a resistant marine sedimentary quartzite that was eroded to form monadnocks that later became islands in Cambrian time. Those islands withstood wave action long enough to become re-buried by other sediments in the Cambrian Period. Dox Formation is over 3,000 feet (910 m) thick and is made of sandstone with some interbedded shale beds and mudstone that were deposited in fluvial and tidal environments. Ripple marks and other features indicate it was close to the shore. Outcrops of this red to orange formation can be seen in the eastern parts of the canyon. Fossils of stromatolites and algae are found in this layer. At 1070 ± 70 million years old, the Cardenas Basalt is the youngest formation in the Unkar Group. It is made of layers of dark brown basaltic rocks that flowed as lava up to 1,000 feet (300 m) thick.

Nankoweap Formation is around 1050 million years old and is not part of a group. This rock unit is made of coarse-grained sandstone, and was deposited in a shallow sea on top of the eroded surface of the Cardenas Basalt. The Nankoweap is only exposed in the eastern part of the canyon. A gap in the geologic record, an unconformity, follows the Nankoweap.

All formations in the Chuar Group were deposited in coastal and shallow sea environments about 1000 to 700 million years ago. The Galeros Formation is a mainly greenish formation composed of interbedded sandstone, limestone, and shale. Fossilized stromatolites are found in the Galeros. The Kwagunt Formation consists of black shale and red to purple mudstone with some limestone. Isolated pockets of reddish sandstone are also found around Carbon Butte. Stromatolites are found in this layer.

About 800 million years ago the supergroup was tilted 15° and block faulted in the Grand Canyon Orogeny. Some of the block units moved down and others moved up while fault movement created north–south-trending fault-block mountain ranges. About 100 million years of erosion took place that washed most of the Chuar Group away along with part of the Unkar Group (exposing the Shinumo Quartzite as previously explained). The mountain ranges were reduced to hills, and in some places, the whole 12,000 feet (3,700 m) of the supergroup were removed entirely, exposing the basement rocks below. Any rocks that were deposited on top of the Grand Canyon Supergroup in the Precambrian were completely removed. This created a major unconformity that represents 460 million years of lost geologic history in the area.

== Tonto Group ==
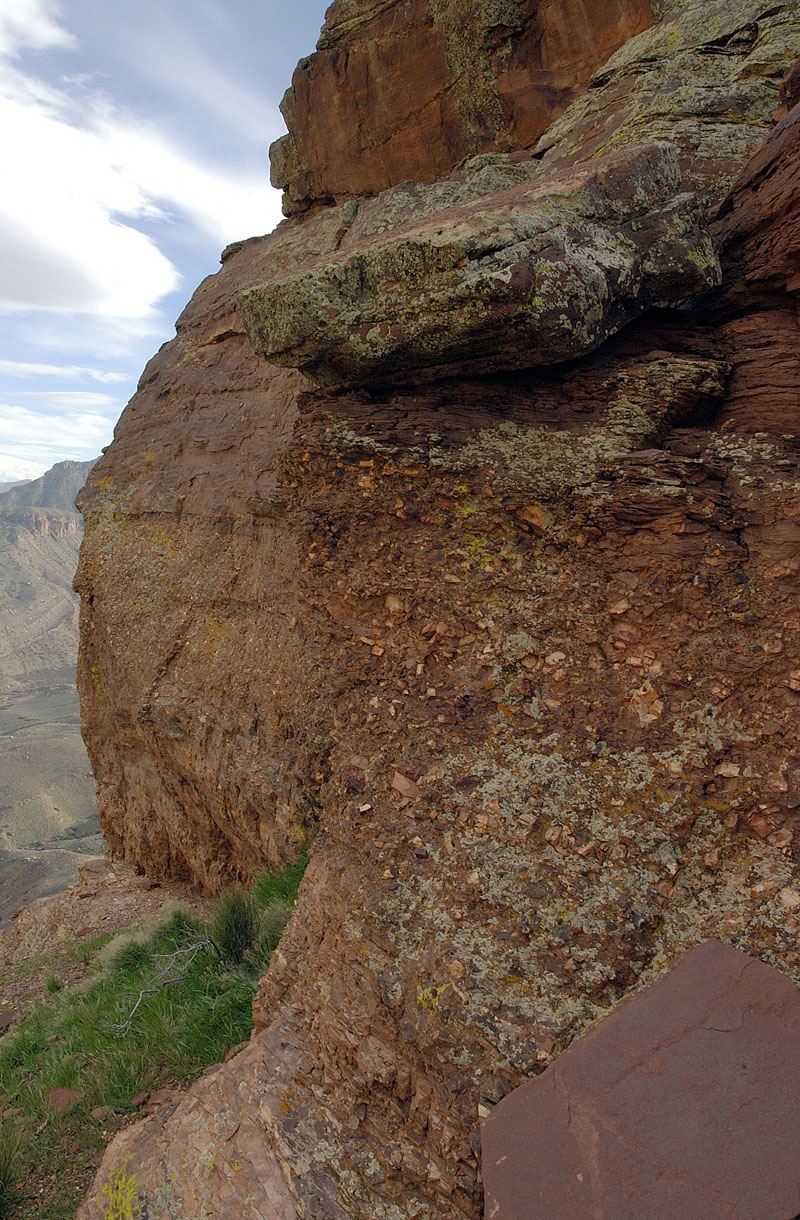
Sixtymile Formation is the basal unit, where present, of the Tonto Group

During the Paleozoic era, the western part of what would become North America was near the equator and on a passive margin. The Cambrian Explosion of life took place over about 15 million years in this part of the world. Climate was warm and invertebrates, such as the trilobites, were abundant. An ocean started to return to the Grand Canyon area from the west about 550 million years ago. As its shoreline moved east, river profiles rose and fluvial sediments accumulated within tectonic basins and coastal plains at first as the Sixtymile Formation, a tan-colored sandstone with some small layers of shale. Later rising sea level resulted in the local accumulation of sediments in paleovalleys as the base of the Tapeat Sandstone. As sea level rose, the ocean flooded the coastal plain causing the concurrent deposition of the Tapeats Sandstone, Bright Angel Shale, Muav Limestone, and Frenchman Mountain Dolostone. Finally, the Frenchman Mountain Dolostone accumulated in beneath shallow seas.

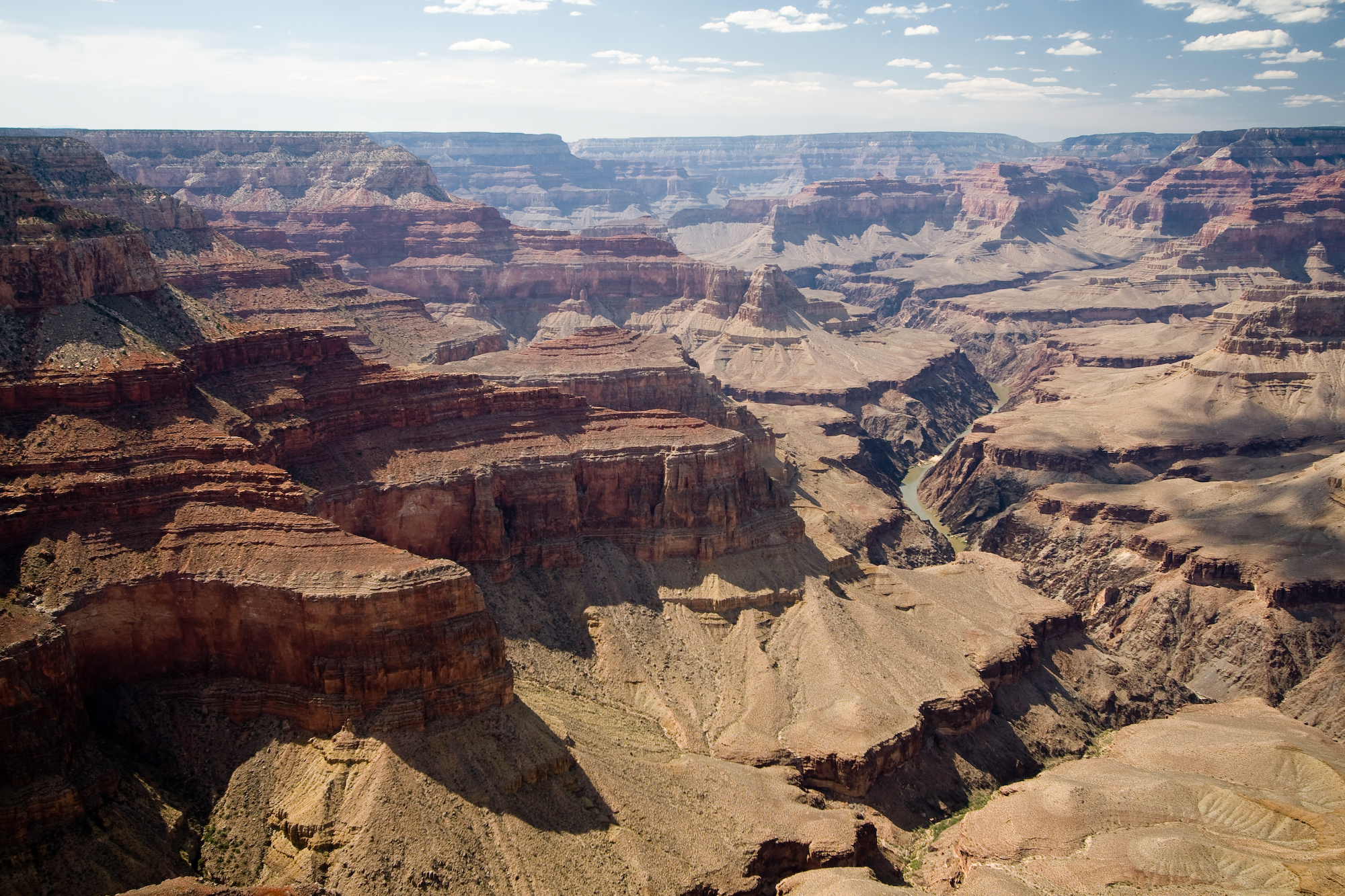
Tonto Group is most easily seen as the broad Tonto Platform just above the Colorado River

Tapeats Sandstone averages 525 million years old and is made of medium- to coarse-grained sand and conglomerate that was deposited on an ancient shore (see 3a in figure 1). Ripple marks are common in the upper members of this dark brown thin-bedded layer. Fossils and imprint trails of trilobites and brachiopods have also been found in the Tapeats. Today it is a cliff-former that is 100 to 325 feet (30 to 100 m) thick. Bright Angel Shale averages 515 million years old and is made of mudstone-derived shale that is interbedded with small sections of sandstone and shaly limestone with a few thin beds of dolomite. It was mostly deposited as mud just offshore and contains brachiopod, trilobite, and worm fossils (see 3b in figure 1). The color of this formation is mostly various shades of green with some brownish-tan to gray parts. It is a slope-former and is 270 to 450 feet (82 to 137 m) thick. Glauconite is responsible for the green coloration of the Bright Angel. Muav Limestone averages 505 million years old and is made of gray, thin-bedded limestone that was deposited farther offshore from calcium carbonate precipitates (see 3c in figure 1). The western part of the canyon has a much thicker sequence of Muav than the eastern part. The Muav is a cliff-former, 136 to 827 feet (41 to 252 m) thick.

These three formations were laid down over a period of 30 million years from early-to-middle Cambrian time. Trilobites followed by brachiopods are the most commonly reported fossils in this group but well-preserved fossils are relatively rare. We know that the shoreline was transgressing (advancing onto land) because finer grade material was deposited on top of coarser-grained sediment. Today, the Tonto Group makes up the Tonto Platform seen above and following the Colorado River; the Tapeats Sandstone and Muav Limestone form the platform's cliffs and the Bright Angel Shale forms its slopes. Unlike the Proterozoic units below it, the Tonto Group's beds basically lie in their original horizontal position. The Bright Angel Shale in the group forms an aquiclude (barrier to groundwater seeping down), and thus collects and directs water through the overlying Muav Limestone to feed springs in the Inner Gorge.

== Temple Butte, Redwall, and Surprise Canyon ==
The next two periods of geologic history, the Ordovician and the Silurian, are missing from the Grand Canyon sequence. Geologists do not know if sediments were deposited in these periods and were later removed by erosion or if they were never deposited in the first place. Either way, this break in the geologic history of the area spans about 65 million years. A type of unconformity called a disconformity was formed. Disconformities show erosional features such as valleys, hills and cliffs that are later covered by younger sediments.

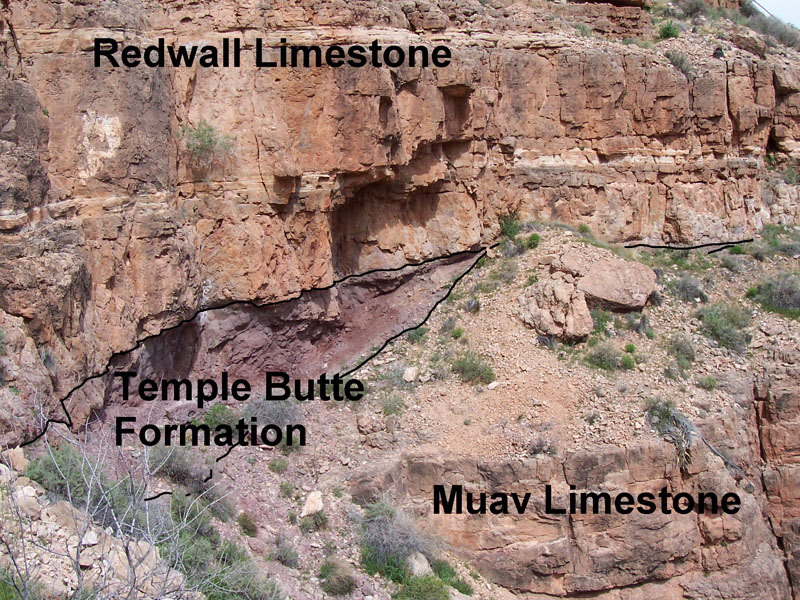
Temple Butte Formation was deposited on the eroded surface of the Muav Limestone. It in turn was buried by Redwall Limestone

Geologists do know that deep channels were carved on the top of the Muav Limestone during this time. Streams were the likely cause, but marine scour may be to blame. Either way, these depressions were filled with freshwater limestone about 385 million years ago in the Middle Devonian in a formation that geologists call the Temple Butte Formation (see 4a in figure 1). Marble Canyon in the eastern part of the park displays these filled purplish-colored channels well. Temple Butte Formation is a cliff-former in the western part of the park where it is gray to cream-colored dolomite. Fossils of animals with backbones are found in this formation; bony plates from freshwater fish in the eastern part and numerous marine fish fossils in the western part. Temple Butte Formation is 100 to 450 feet (30 to 137 m) thick; thinner near Grand Canyon Village and thicker in western Grand Canyon. An unconformity representing 40 to 50 million years of lost geologic history marks the top of this formation.

The next formation in the Grand Canyon geologic column is the cliff-forming Redwall Limestone, which is 400 to 800 feet (120 to 240 m) thick (see 4b in figure 1). Redwall is composed of thick-bedded, dark brown to bluish gray limestone and dolomite with white chert nodules mixed in. It was laid down in a retreating shallow tropical sea near the equator during 40 million years of the early-to-middle Mississippian. Many fossilized crinoids, brachiopods, bryozoans, horn corals, nautiloids, and sponges, along with other marine organisms such as large and complex trilobites have been found in the Redwall. In late Mississippian time, the Grand Canyon region was slowly uplifted and the Redwall was partly eroded away. A Karst topography consisting of caves, sinkholes, and subterranean river channels resulted but were later filled with more limestone. The exposed surface of Redwall gets its characteristic color from rainwater dripping from the iron-rich redbeds of the Supai and Hermit shale that lie above.

Surprise Canyon Formation is a sedimentary layer of purplish-red shale that was laid down in discontinuous beds of sand and lime above the Redwall (see 4c in figure 1). It was created in very late Mississippian and possibly in very earliest Pennsylvanian time as the land subsided and tidal estuaries filled river valleys with sediment. This formation only exists in isolated lenses that are 50 to 400 feet (15 to 122 m) thick. Surprise Canyon was unknown to science until 1973 and can be reached only by helicopter. Fossil logs, other plant material and marine shells are found in this formation. An unconformity marks the top of the Surprise Canyon Formation and in most places this unconformity has entirely removed the Surprise Canyon and exposed the underlying Redwall.

== Supai Group ==
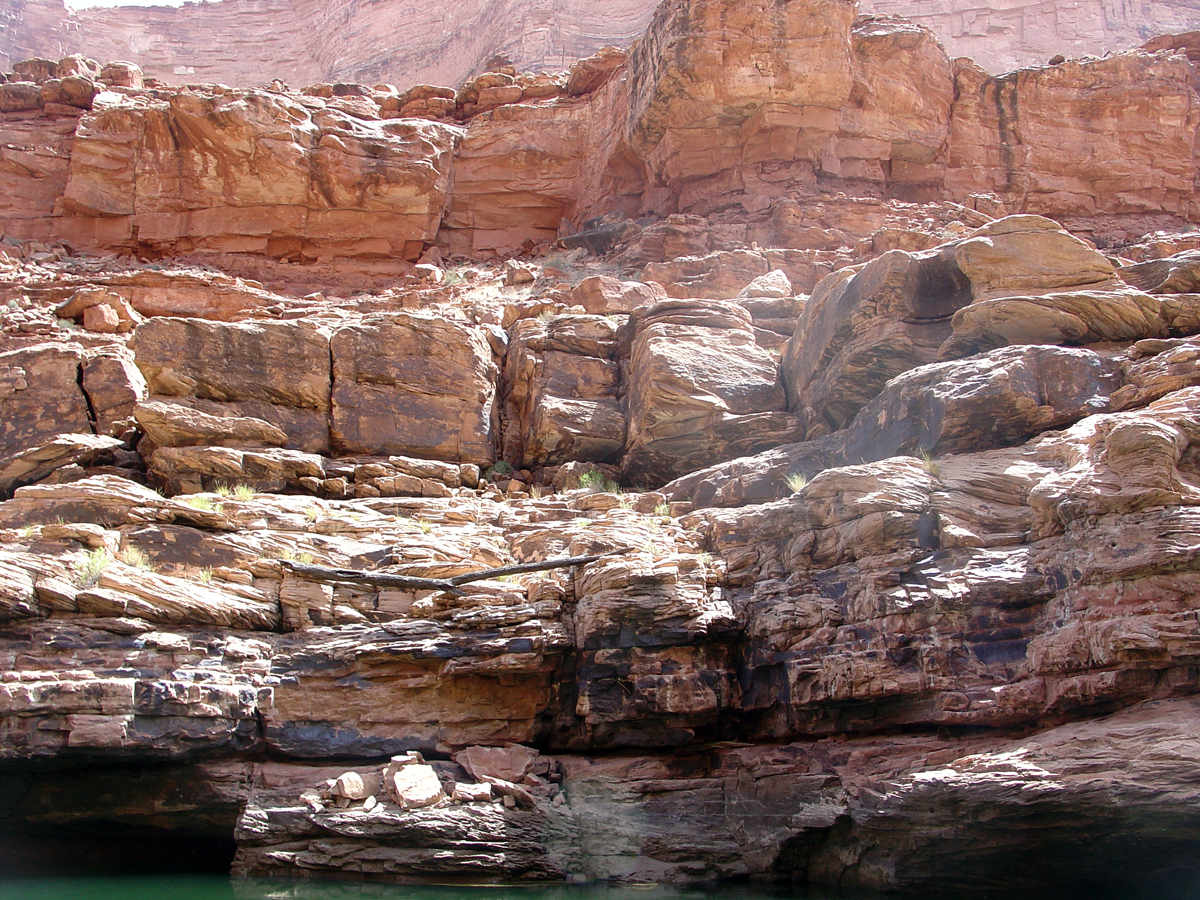
Supai Group with a stranded log from a pre-Glen Canyon Dam flood

An unconformity of 15 to 20 million years separates the Supai Group from the previously deposited Redwall Formation. Supai Group was deposited in late Mississippian, through the Pennsylvanian and into the Early Permian time, some 320 million to 270 million years ago. Both marine and non-marine deposits of mud, silt, sand and calcareous sediments were laid down on a broad coastal plain similar to the Texas Gulf Coast of today. Around this time, the Ancestral Rocky Mountains rose in Colorado and New Mexico and streams brought eroded sediment from them to the Grand Canyon area.

Supai Group formations in the western part of the canyon contain limestone, indicative of a warm, shallow sea, while the eastern part was probably a muddy river delta. This formation consists of red siltstones and shale capped by tan-colored sandstone beds that together reach a thickness of 600 to 700 ft (around 200 m). Shale in the early Permian formations in this group were oxidized to a bright red color. Fossils of amphibian footprints, reptiles, and plentiful plant material are found in the eastern part and increasing numbers of marine fossils are found in the western part.

Formations of the Supai Group are from oldest to youngest (an unconformity is present at the top of each): Watahomigi (see 5a in figure 1) is a slope-forming gray limestone with some red chert bands, sandstone, and purple siltstone that is 100 to 300 feet (30 to 90 m) thick. Manakacha (see 5b in figure 1) is a cliff- and slope-forming pale red sandstone and red shale that averages 300 feet (90 m) thick in Grand Canyon. Wescogame (see 5c in figure 1) is a ledge- and slope-forming pale red sandstone and siltstone that is 100 to 200 feet (30 to 60 m) thick. Esplanade (see 5d in figure 1) is a ledge- and cliff-forming pale red sandstone and siltstone that is 200 to 800 feet (60 to 200 m) thick. An unconformity marks the top of the Supai Group.

== Hermit, Coconino, Toroweap, and Kaibab ==
Like the Supai Group below it, the Permian-aged Hermit Formation was probably deposited on a broad coastal plain (see 6a in figure 1). The alternating thin-bedded iron oxide, mud and silt were deposited via freshwater streams in a semiarid environment around 280 million years ago. Fossils of winged insects, cone-bearing plants, and ferns are found in this formation as well as tracks of vertebrate animals. It is a soft, deep red shale and mudstone slope-former that is approximately 100 to 900 feet (30 to 274 m) thick. Slope development will periodically undermine the formations above and car- to house-sized blocks of that rock will cascade down onto the Tonto Platform. An unconformity marks the top of this formation.

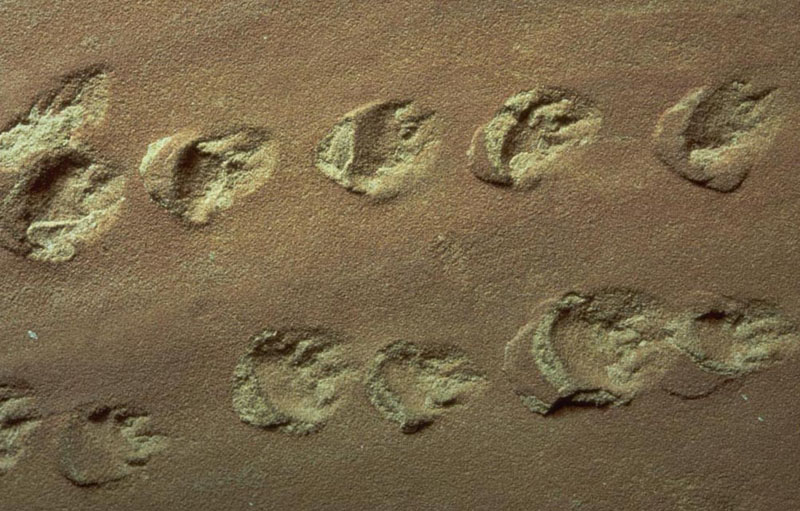
Lizard-like animals left their footprints in Coconino Sandstone

Coconino Sandstone formed about 275 million years ago as the area dried out and sand dunes made of quartz sand invaded a growing desert (see 6b in figure 1). Some Coconino fills deep mudcracks in the underlying Hermit Shale and the desert that created the Coconino lasted for 5 to 10 million years. Today, the Coconino is a 57 to 600 feet (17 to 183 m) thick golden white to cream-colored cliff-former near the canyon's rim. Cross bedding patterns of the frosted, fine-grained, well-sorted and rounded quartz grains seen in its cliffs is compatible with but does not substantiate conclusively an eolian environment. Also fossilized are tracks from lizard-like creatures and what look like tracks from millipedes and scorpions. An unconformity marks the top of this formation.

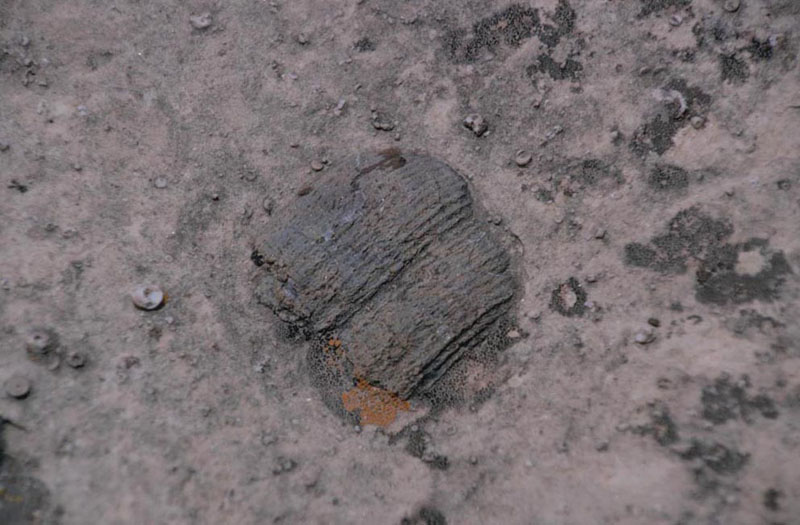
Fossils, such as this brachiopod and fragments of crinoids, are common in the Toroweap and Kaibab formations

Next in the geologic column is the 200-foot (60 m)-thick Toroweap Formation (see 6c in figure 1). It consists of red and yellow sandstone and shaly gray limestone interbedded with gypsum. The formation was deposited in a warm, shallow sea as the shoreline transgressed (invaded) and regressed (retreated) over the land. The average age of the rock is about 273 million years. In modern times it is a ledge- and slope-former that contains fossils of brachiopods, corals, and mollusks along with other animals and various terrestrial plants. The Toroweap is divided into the following three members: Seligman is a slope-forming yellowish to reddish sandstone and siltstone. Brady Canyon is a cliff-forming gray limestone with some chert. Wood Ranch is a slope-forming pale red and gray siltstone and dolomitic sandstone. An unconformity marks the top of this formation.

One of the highest, and therefore youngest, formations seen in the Grand Canyon area is the Kaibab Limestone (see 6d in figure 1). It erodes into ledgy cliffs that are 300 to 400 feet (90 to 100 m) thick and was laid down in latest early Permian time, about 270 million years ago, by an advancing warm, shallow sea. The formation is typically made of sandy limestone sitting on top of a layer of sandstone. This is the cream to grayish-white rock that park visitors stand on while viewing the canyon from both rims. It is also the surface rock covering much of the Kaibab Plateau just north of the canyon and the Coconino Plateau immediately south. Shark teeth have been found in this formation as well as abundant fossils of marine invertebrates such as brachiopods, corals, mollusks, sea lilies, and worms. An unconformity marks the top of this formation.

== Mesozoic deposition ==
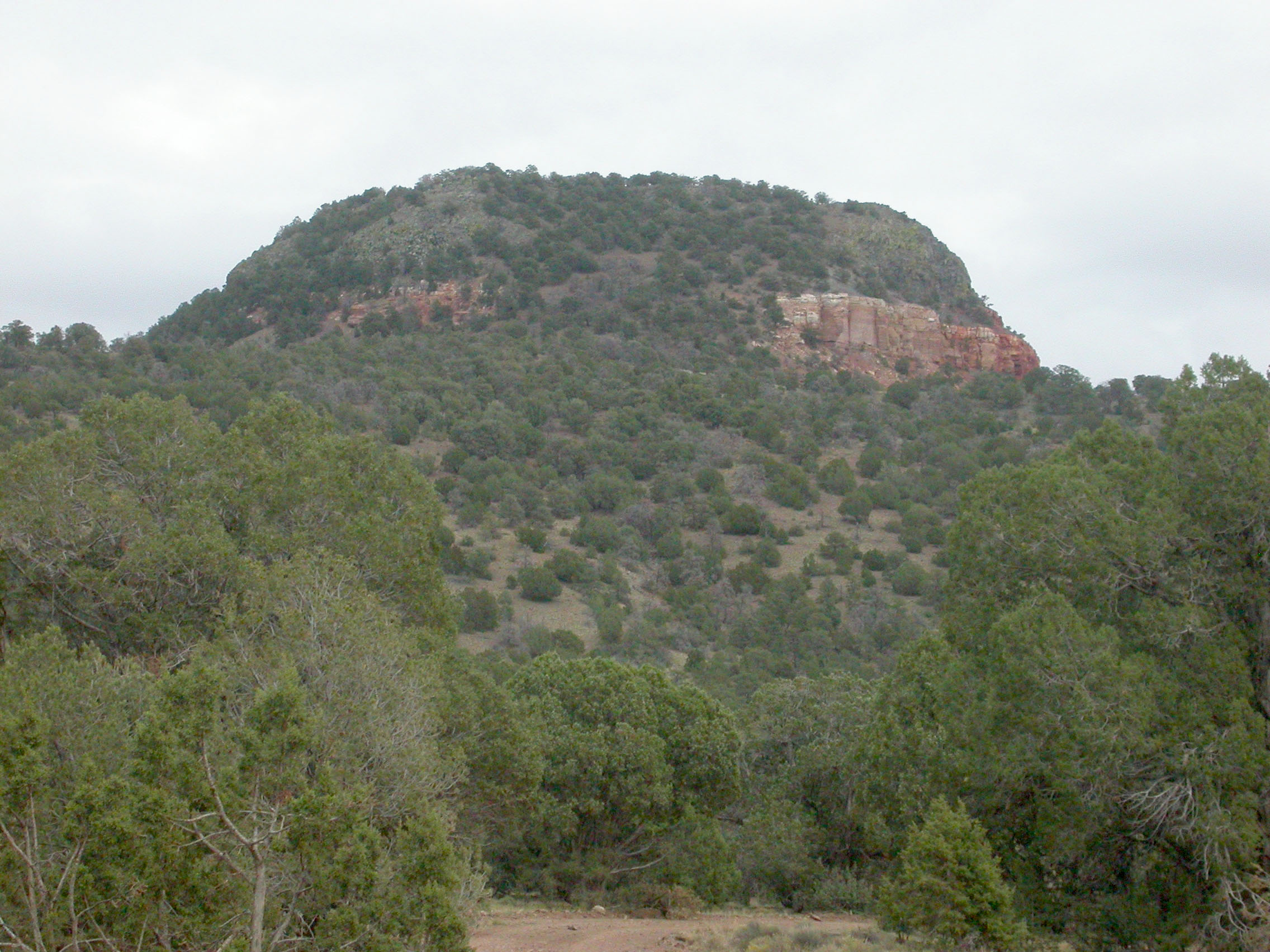
Reddish Moenkopi outcrop below volcanic rubble on Red Butte

Uplift marked the start of the Mesozoic and streams started to incise the newly dry land. Streams flowing through broad low valleys in Triassic time deposited sediment eroded from nearby uplands, creating the once 1,000-foot (300 m)-thick Moenkopi Formation. The formation is made from sandstone and shale with gypsum layers in between. Moenkopi outcrops are found along the Colorado River in Marble Canyon, on Cedar Mountain (a mesa near the southeastern park border), and in Red Butte (located south of Grand Canyon Village). Remnants of the Shinarump Conglomerate, itself a member of the Chinle Formation, are above the Moenkopi Formation near the top of Red Butte but below a much younger lava flow.

Formations totaling over 4,000 to 5,000 feet (1,200 to 1,500 m) in thickness were deposited in the region in the Mesozoic and Cenozoic but were almost entirely removed from the Grand Canyon sequence by subsequent erosion. The geology of the Zion and Kolob canyons area and the geology of the Bryce Canyon area records some of these formations. All these rock units together form a super sequence of rock known as the Grand Staircase.

== Cenozoic regional uplift and erosion of the canyon ==
=== Uplift and nearby extension ===
The Laramide orogeny affected all of western North America by helping to build the American cordillera. The Kaibab Uplift, Monument Upwarp, the Uinta Mountains, San Rafael Swell, and the Rocky Mountains were uplifted, at least in part, by the Laramide orogeny. This major mountain-building event started near the end of the Mesozoic, around 75 million years ago, and continued into the Eocene period of the Cenozoic. It was caused by subduction off the western coast of North America. Major faults that trend north–south and cross the canyon area were reactivated by this uplift. Many of these faults are Precambrian in age and are still active today. Streams draining the Rocky Mountains in early Miocene time terminated in landlocked basins in Utah, Arizona and Nevada but there is no evidence for a major river.

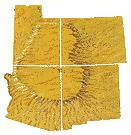
Uplift of the Colorado Plateaus forced rivers to cut down faster.

Around 18 million years ago, tensional forces started to thin and drop the region to the west, creating the Basin and Range Province. Basins (grabens) dropped down and mountain ranges (horsts) rose up between old and new north–south–trending faults. However, for reasons poorly understood, the beds of the Colorado Plateaus remained mostly horizontal through both events even as they were uplifted about 2 miles (3.2 km) in two pulses. (Note: An exception is the slight effect that uplifts, upwarps and swells created by earlier phases of the Laramide orogeny have. For example, formations exposed on the South Rim are 800 feet (240 m) lower than the same formations on the North Rim because the North Rim is closer to the highest part of the Kaibab Uplift.(Foos 1999, p. 1)) The extreme western part of the canyon ends at one of the Basin and Range faults, the Grand Wash, which also marks the boundary between the two provinces.

Uplift from the Laramide orogeny and the creation of the Basin and Range province worked together to steepen the gradient of streams flowing west on the Colorado Plateau. These streams cut deep, eastward-growing, channels into the western edge of the Colorado Plateau and deposited their sediment in the widening Basin and Range region.

According to a 2012 study, there is evidence that the western Grand Canyon could be as old as 70 million years.

=== Colorado River: origin and development ===
Rifting started to create the Gulf of California far to the south 6 to 10 million years ago. Around the same time, the western edge of the Colorado Plateau may have sagged slightly. Both events changed the direction of many streams toward the sagging region and the increased gradient caused them to downcut much faster. From 5.5 million to 5 million years ago, headward erosion to the north and east consolidated these streams into one major river and associated tributary channels. This river, the ancestral Lower Colorado River, started to fill the northern arm of the gulf, which extended nearly to the site of Hoover Dam, with estuary deposits.

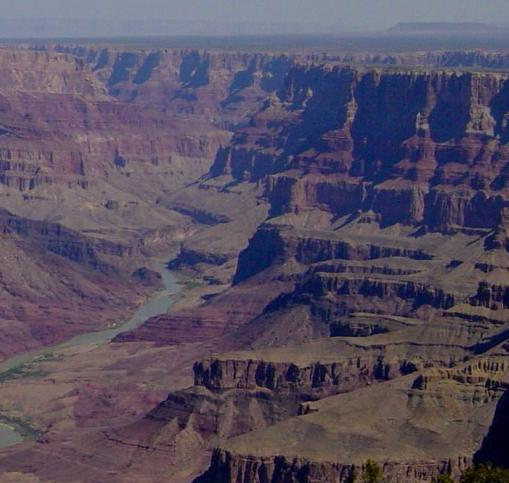
The Colorado River had cut down to nearly the current depth of the Grand Canyon by 1.2 million years ago.

At the same time, streams flowed from highlands in central Arizona north and across what is today the western Grand Canyon, possibly feeding a larger river. The mechanism by which the ancestral Lower Colorado River captured this drainage and the drainage from much of the rest of the Colorado Plateau is not known. Possible explanations include headward erosion or a broken natural dam of a lake or river. Whatever the cause, the Lower Colorado probably captured the landlocked Upper Colorado somewhere west of the Kaibab Uplift. The much larger drainage area and yet steeper stream gradient helped to further accelerate downcutting.

Ice ages during the Pleistocene brought a cooler and wetter pluvial climate to the region starting 2 to 3 million years ago. The added precipitation increased runoff and the erosive ability of streams (especially from spring melt water and flash floods in summer). (Note: Increased precipitation also allowed evergreen forests, in modern times limited to an elevation of 7,000 feet (2,100 m), to extend well into the canyon.(Price 1999, p. 42)) With a greatly increased flow volume the Colorado cut faster than ever before and started to quickly excavate the Grand Canyon 2 million years before present, almost reaching the modern depth by 1.2 million years ago.

The resulting Grand Canyon of the Colorado River trends roughly east to west for 278 miles (447 km) between Lake Powell and Lake Mead. In that distance, the Colorado River drops 2,000 feet (610 m) and has excavated an estimated 1,000 cubic miles (4,200 km^{3}) of sediment to form the canyon. This part of the river bisects the 9,000-foot (2,700 m)-high Kaibab Uplift and passes seven plateaus (the Kaibab, Kanab, and Shivwits plateaus bound the northern part of the canyon and the Coconino bounds the southern part). Each of these plateaus are bounded by north–south-trending faults and monoclines created or reactivated during the Laramide orogeny. Streams flowing into the Colorado River have since exploited these faults to excavate their own tributary canyons, such as Bright Angel Canyon. (Note: The Grand Canyon region gently slopes southward, so water on the North Rim flows into the canyon and water on the South Rim tends to flow away. Tributary canyons are therefore larger north of Grand Canyon and smaller south of it. Grand Canyon Village on the South Rim is located 2 miles (3.2 km) from the Colorado River and 4,460 feet (1,360 m) above it while Bright Angel Point on the North Rim is located 7.75 miles (12.47 km) from the river and is 5,940 feet (1,810 m) above it.(Chronic 2004, p. 98))

=== Volcanic activity in the western canyon ===
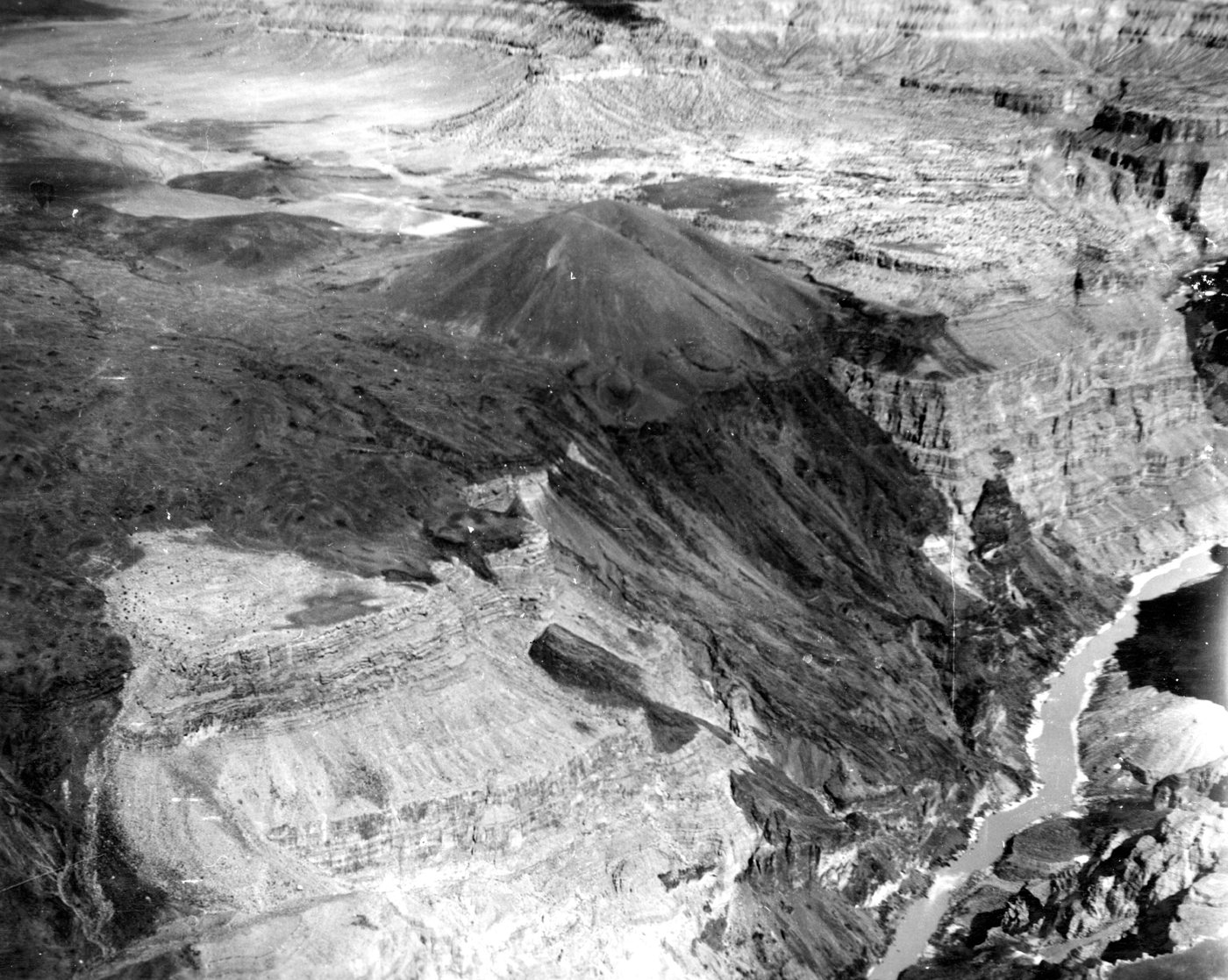
Vulcan's Throne volcano above Lava Falls. Lava flows, such as this heavily eroded remnant, once dammed the Colorado River.

Volcanic activity started in Uinkaret volcanic field (in the western Grand Canyon) about 3 million years ago. Over 150 flows of basaltic lava dammed the Colorado River at least 13 times from 725,000 to 100,000 years ago. The dams typically formed in weeks, were 12 to 86 miles (19 to 138 km) long, 150 to 2,000 feet (46 to 610 m) high (thicker upstream and thinner downstream) and had volumes of 0.03 to 1.2 cubic miles (0.13 to 5.00 km^{3}).

The longevity of the dams and their ability to hold Colorado River water in large lakes has been debated. In one hypothesis water from the Colorado River backed up behind the dams in large lakes that extended as far as Moab, Utah. Dams were overtopped in short time; those that were 150 to 400 feet (46 to 122 m) high were overtopped by their lakes in 2 to 17 days. At the same time, sediment filled the lakes behind the dams. Sediment would fill a lake behind a 150-foot (46 m)-high dam in 10.33 months, filled a lake behind an 1,150-foot (350 m)-high dam in 345 years, and filled the lake behind the tallest dam in 3000 years. Cascades of water flowed over a dam while waterfalls migrated up-river along it. Most lava dams lasted for around 10,000 to 20,000 years. However others have proposed that the lava dams were much more ephemeral and failed catastrophically before overtopping. In this model dams would fail due to fluid flow through fractures in the dams and around dam abutments, through permeable river deposits and alluvium.

Since the demise of these dams the Colorado River has carved a maximum of about 160 feet (49 m) into the rocks of the Colorado Plateau

== Ongoing geology and human impact ==
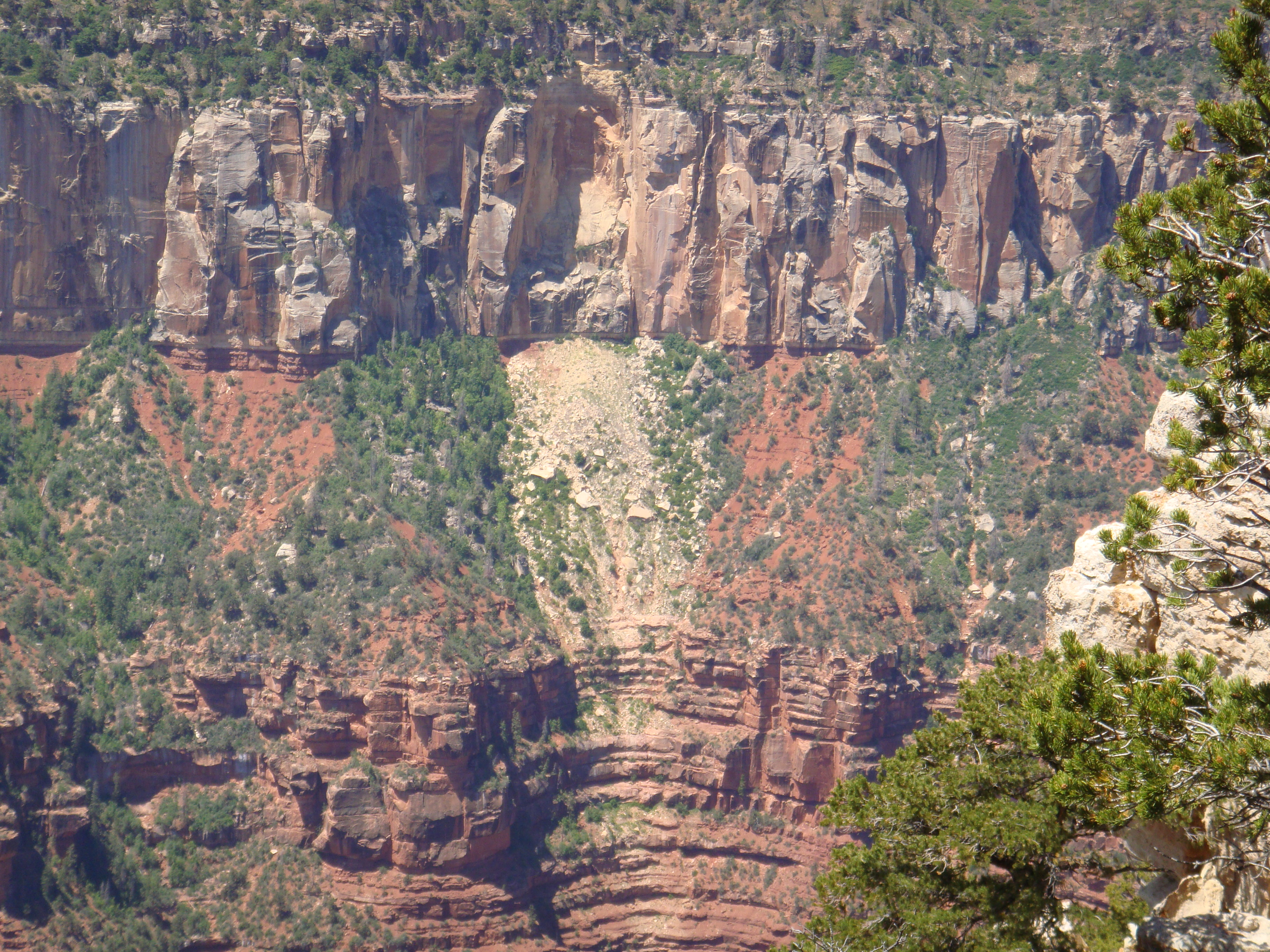
Historic rockfall on the north rim.

The end of the Pleistocene ice ages and the start of the Holocene began to change the area's climate from a cool, wet pluvial one to dryer semi-arid conditions similar to that of today. With less water to cut, the erosive ability of the Colorado was greatly reduced. Mass wasting processes thus began to become relatively more important than they were before. Steeper cliffs and further widening the Grand Canyon and its tributary canyon system occurred. An average of two debris flows per year reach the Colorado River from tributary canyons to form or expand rapids. This type of mass wasting is the main way the smaller and steeper side canyons transport sediment but it also plays a major role in excavating the larger canyons.

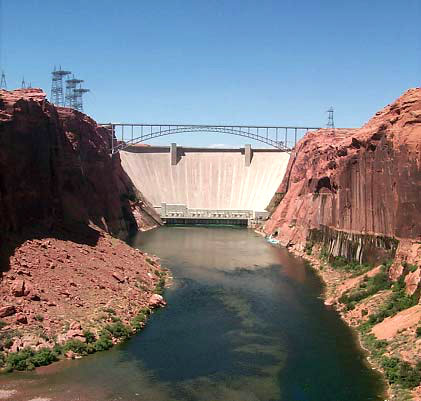
Glen Canyon Dam has greatly reduced the amount of sediment transported by the Colorado River through the Grand Canyon.

In 1963 Glen Canyon Dam and other dams farther upstream started to regulate the flow of the Colorado River through Grand Canyon. Pre-dam but still historic flows of the Colorado through Grand Canyon ranged from 700 to 100,000 cubic feet (20 to 2,832 m^{3}) per second with at least one late 19th century flood of 300,000 cubic feet (8,500 m^{3}) per second. Discharge from Glen Canyon Dam exceeds 48,200 cubic feet (1,360 m^{3}) per second only when there is danger of overtopping the dam or when the level of Lake Powell otherwise needs to be lowered. An interim conservation measure since 1991 has held maximum flows at 20,000 cubic feet (570 m^{3}) per second even though the dam's power plant can handle 13,200 cubic feet (370 m^{3}) per second more flow.

Controlling river flow by use of dams has diminished the river's ability to scour rocks by substantially reducing the amount of sediment it carries. Dams on the Colorado River have also changed the character of the river water. Once both muddy and warm, the river is now clear and averages a 46 °F (8 °C) temperature year-round. Experimental floods approaching the 48,200 cubic feet (1,360 m^{3}) per second level mentioned above have been carried out in 1996 and 2004 to study the effects on sediment erosion and deposition.

Grand Canyon lies on the southern end of the Intermountain West seismic belt. At least 35 earthquakes larger than 3.0 on the Richter Scale occurred in the Grand Canyon region in the 20th century. Of these, five registered over 5.0 on the Richter Scale and the largest was a 6.2 quake that occurred in January 1906. Major roughly north–south-trending faults that cross the canyon are (from west to east), the Grand Wash, Hurricane and Toroweap. Major northeast-trending fracture systems of normal faults that intersect the canyon include the West Kaibab and Bright Angel while northwest-trending systems include the Grandview—Phantom. Most earthquakes in the region occur in a narrow northwest-trending band between the Mesa Butte and West Kaibab fracture systems. These events are probably the result of eastward-migrating crustal stretching that may eventually move past the Grand Canyon area.

== Trail of Time and Yavapai Geology Museum ==
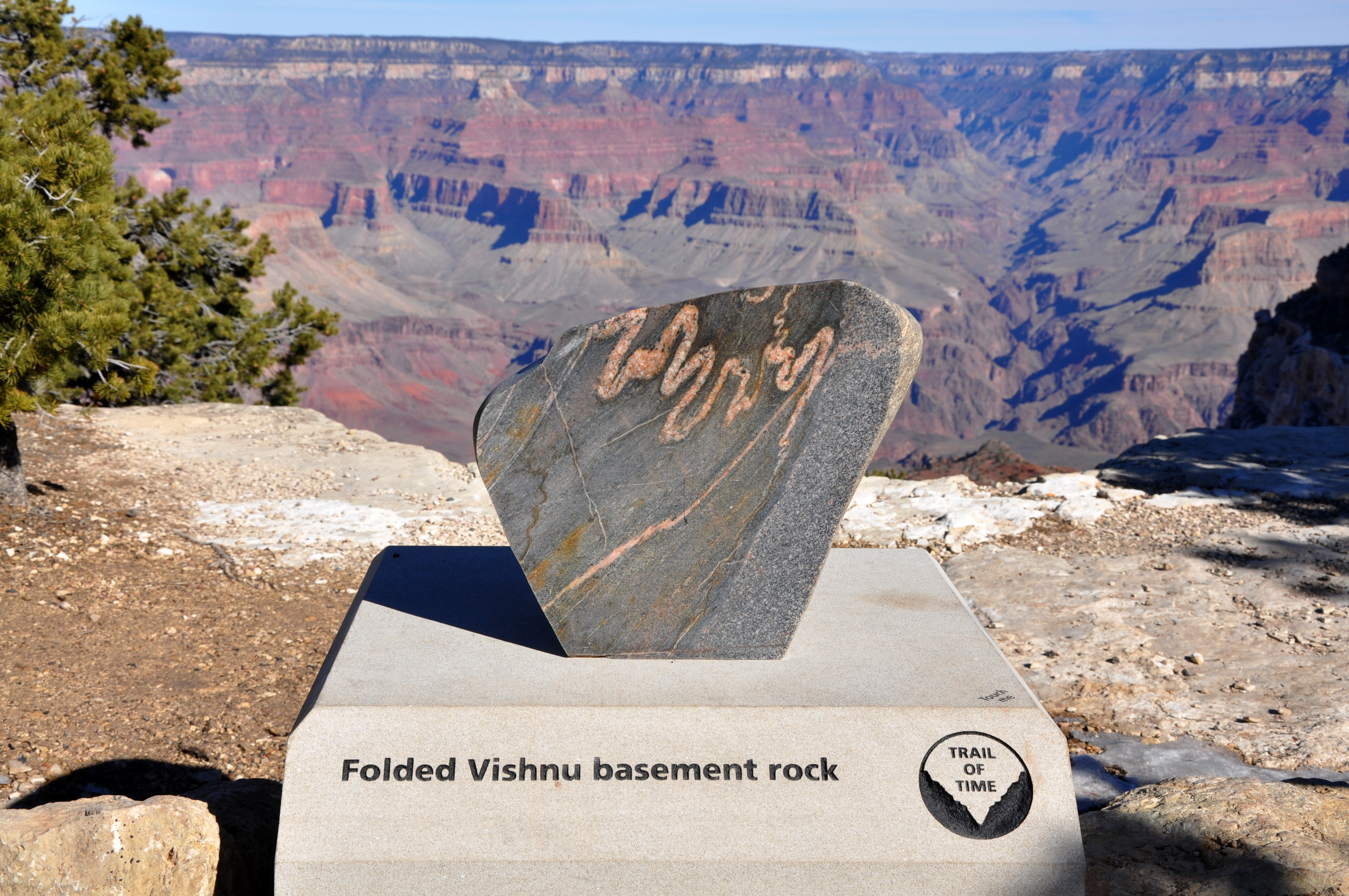
Grand Canyon Trail of Time – Folded Vishnu schist basement rock.

The Trail of Time is an outdoor geology exhibit and nature trail on the South Rim of Grand Canyon National Park. Each meter walked on the trail represents one million years of Grand Canyon's geologic history. Bronze markers on the trail mark your location in time. The trail begins at "Today" near the Yavapai Geology Museum, and ends 2 billion years later at Verkamp's Visitor Center. Along the way are samples of the Canyon's rocks, as you would encounter them going from the rim down to the river, and displays explaining the geologic history of the Canyon. The trail opened in late 2010.

The Yavapai Geology Museum include three-dimensional models, photographs, and exhibits which allow park visitors to see and understand the complicated geologic story of the area. The museum building, the historic Yavapai Observation Station (built 1928), located one mile (1.6 km) east of Market Plaza, features expansive canyon views. A bookstore offers a variety of materials about the area.

== See also ==
- Geology of the Colorado Plateau
- Grand Staircase, for regional stratigraphy

== Notes and timeline ==
Timeline (millions of years)

== Bibliography ==
- Beus, Stanley S.; Morales, Michael, eds. (2003). Grand Canyon Geology (2nd ed.). New York; Oxford: Oxford University Press. ISBN 0-19-512299-2.
- Bronze, Black (2003). The Colorado River Super Guide Map of the Grand Canyon. Flagstaff, Arizona: Dragon Creek Publishing.
- Chronic, Halka and Lucy (2004). Pages of Stone: Geology of the Grand Canyon and Plateau Country National Parks and Monuments (2nd ed.). The Mountaineers Books. ISBN 0-89886-680-4.
- Foos, Annabelle (1999). "Geology of Grand Canyon National Park, North Rim" (PDF). Archived from the original (PDF) on 2008-10-10.
- Harris, Ann G.; Tuttle, Esther; Tuttle, Sherwood D. (1997). Geology of National Parks (5th ed.). Iowa: Kendall/Hunt Publishing. ISBN 0-7872-5353-7.
- Kiver, Eugene P.; Harris, David V. (1999). Geology of U.S. Parklands (5th ed.). New York: John Wiley & Sons. ISBN 0-471-33218-6.
- Tufts, Lorraine Salem (1998). Secrets in The Grand Canyon, Zion and Bryce Canyon National Parks (3rd ed.). North Palm Beach, Florida: National Photographic Collections. ISBN 0-9620255-3-4.
- Powell, James Lawrence (2005). Grand Canyon: Solving Earth's Grandest Puzzle. Pi Press. ISBN 0-13-147989-X.
- Ribokas, Bob (2000). "Grand Canyon Rock Layers". Grand Canyon Explorer.
- Price, L. Greer (1999). Geology of the Grand Canyon. Grand Canyon, Arizona: Grand Canyon Association. ISBN 0-938216-68-6.
- Rudd, Connie (1990). Grand Canyon The Continuing Story. KC Publishing, Inc. ISBN 0-88714-046-7.
