= Great Unconformity =

Gap in geological strata in the Grand Canyon

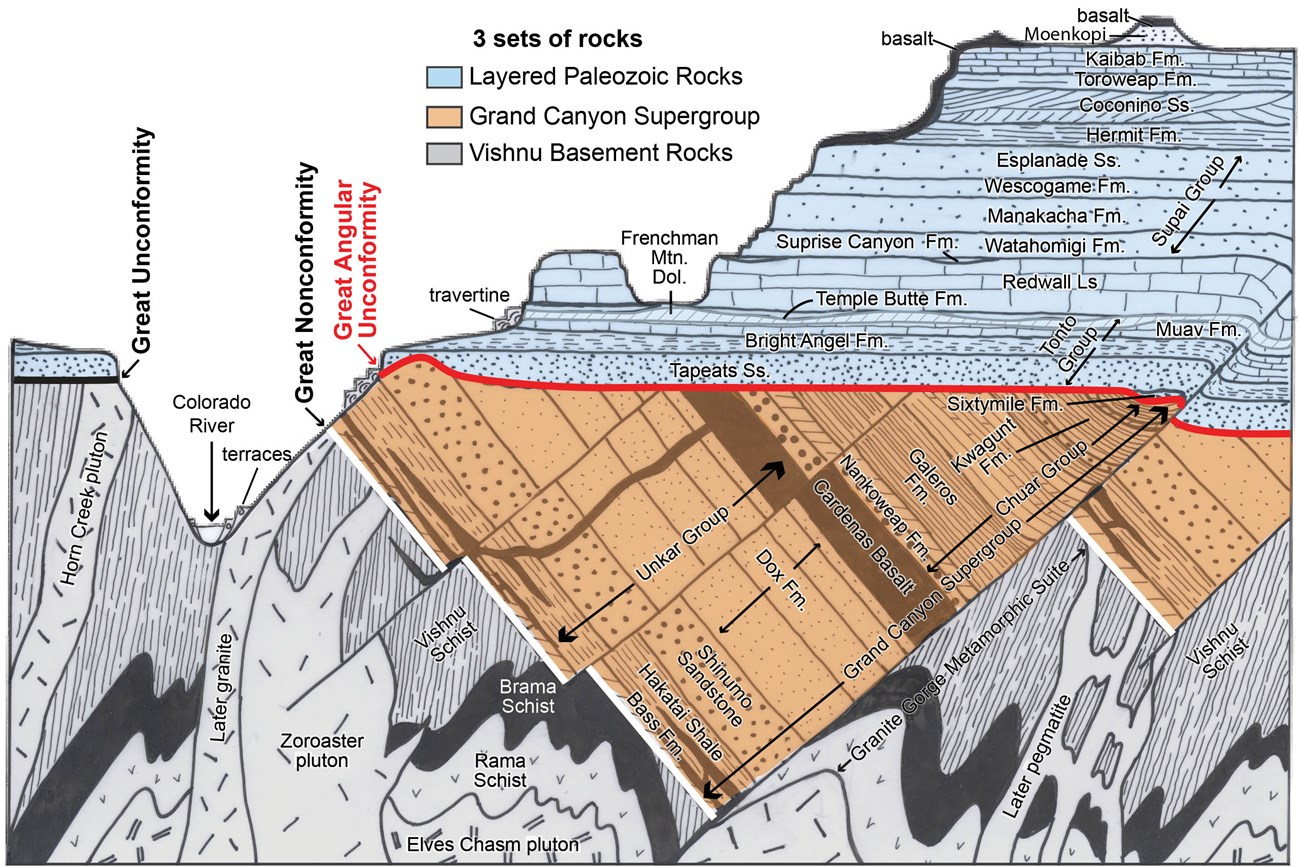
Geologic stratigraphic column of strata exposed in and near the Grand Canyon

The Great Unconformity is the unconformity observed by John Wesley Powell in the Grand Canyon in 1869. It is an exceptional example of relatively young sedimentary rock strata overlying much older sedimentary or crystalline strata. The intervening period of geologic time is sufficiently long to raise the earlier rock into mountains which are then eroded away.

== Powell's Unconformity, Grand Canyon ==
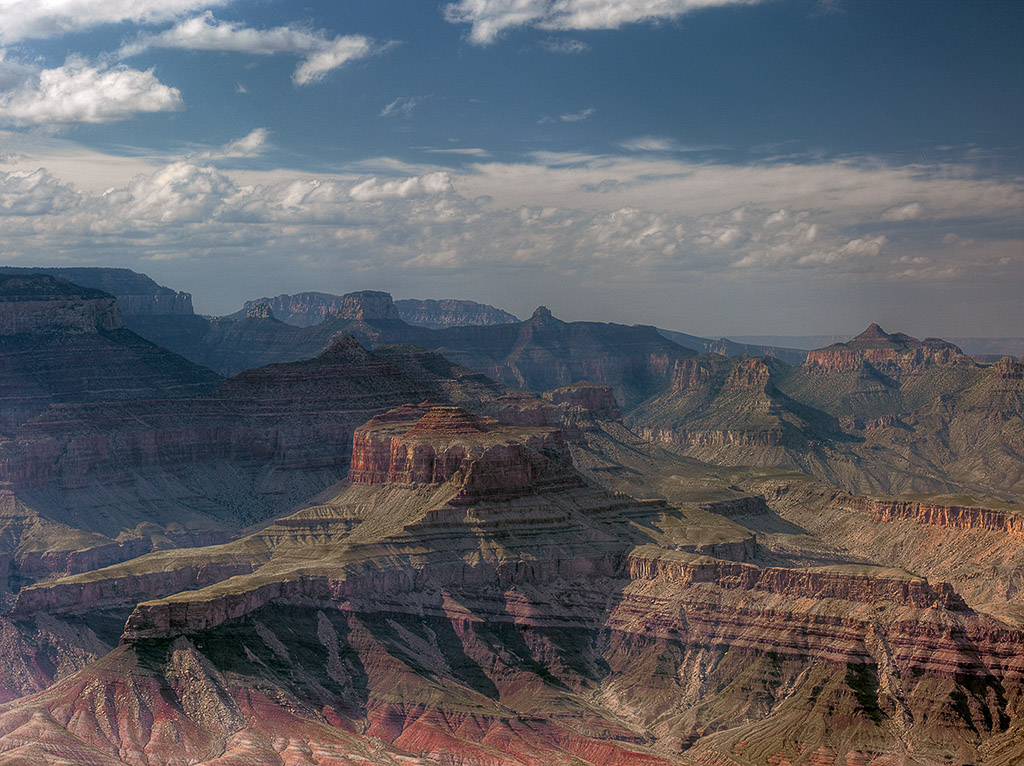
Powell's Unconformity viewed from Lipan Point on the South Rim. Rocks of the Unkar Group of the Grand Canyon Supergroup are truncated at the base of the Tonto Group.

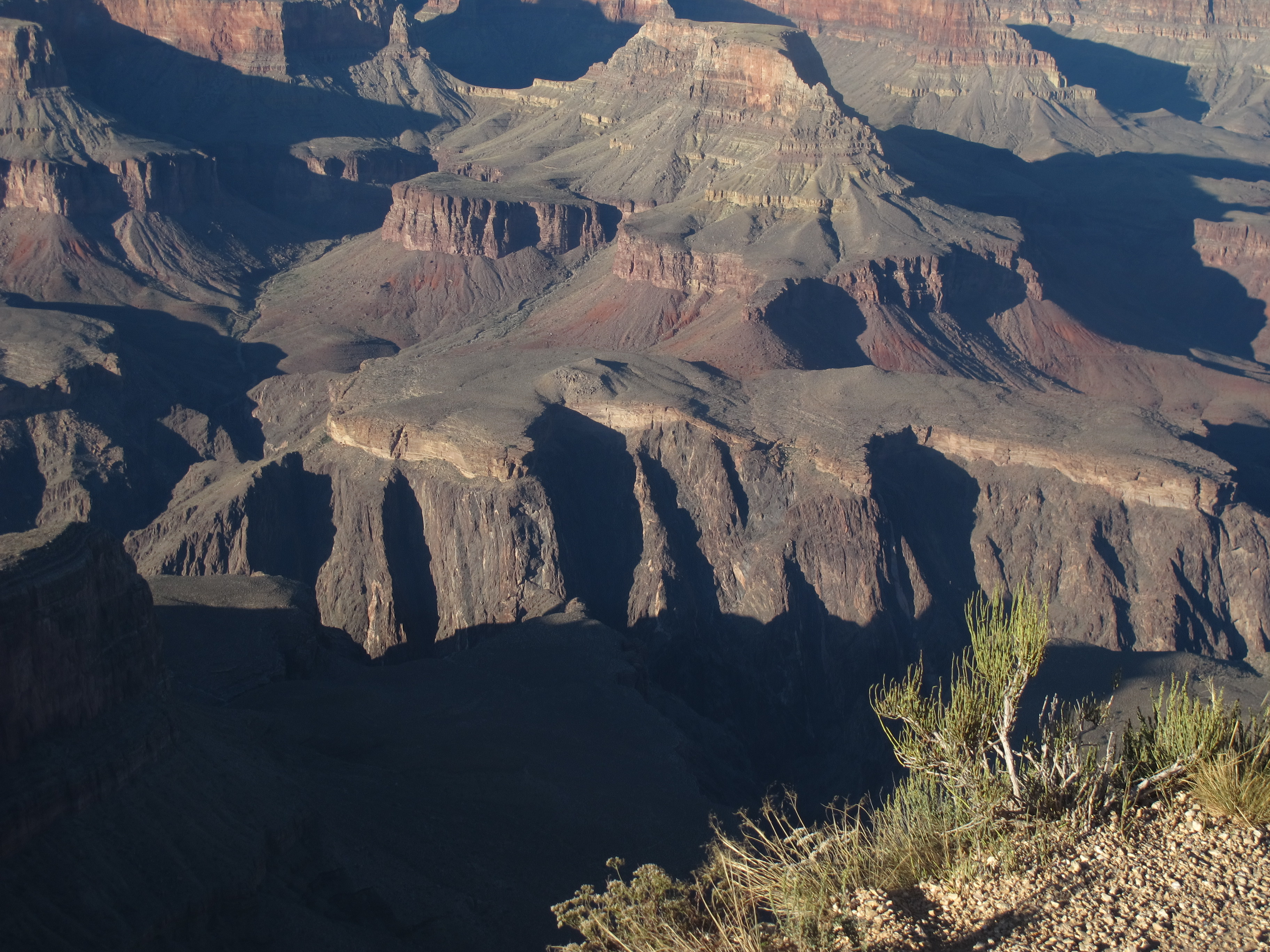
The Great Unconformity seen from Hopi Point on the South Rim. Steeply foliated and veined schists of the Vishnu Basement Rocks truncated at the base of the Tonto Group.

The Great Unconformity in the Grand Canyon is a regional unconformity that separates the Tonto Group from the underlying faulted-and-tilted sedimentary rocks of the Grand Canyon Supergroup and vertically foliated metamorphic and igneous rocks of the Vishnu Basement Rocks. The unconformity between the Tonto Group and the Vishnu Basement Rocks is a nonconformity. The break between the Tonto Group and the Grand Canyon Supergroup is an angular unconformity.

The Great Unconformity is part of a continent-wide unconformity that extends across Laurentia, the ancient core of North America. It was first recognized twelve years before Powell's expedition by John Newberry in New Mexico, during the Ives expedition of 1857–1858. However, the disruption of the American Civil War kept Newberry's work from becoming widely known. This Great Unconformity marks the progressive submergence of this landmass by a shallow cratonic sea and its burial by shallow marine sediments of the Cambrian–Early-Ordovician Sauk sequence. The submergence of Laurentia ended a lengthy period of widespread continental denudation that exhumed and deeply eroded Precambrian rocks and exposed them to extensive physical and chemical weathering at the Earth's surface. As a result, the Great Unconformity is unusual in its geographic extent and its stratigraphic significance.

The length of time represented by the Great Unconformity varies along its length. Within the Grand Canyon, the Great Unconformity represents a period of about 175 million years between the Tonto Group and the youngest subdivision, the Sixtymile Formation, of the Grand Canyon Supergroup. At the base of the Grand Canyon Supergroup, where it truncates the Bass Formation, the period of time represented by this angular unconformity increases to about 725 million years. Where the Tonto Group overlies the Vishnu Basement Rocks, the Great Unconformity represents a period as much as 1.2–1.6 billion years. (See also geological timescale.)

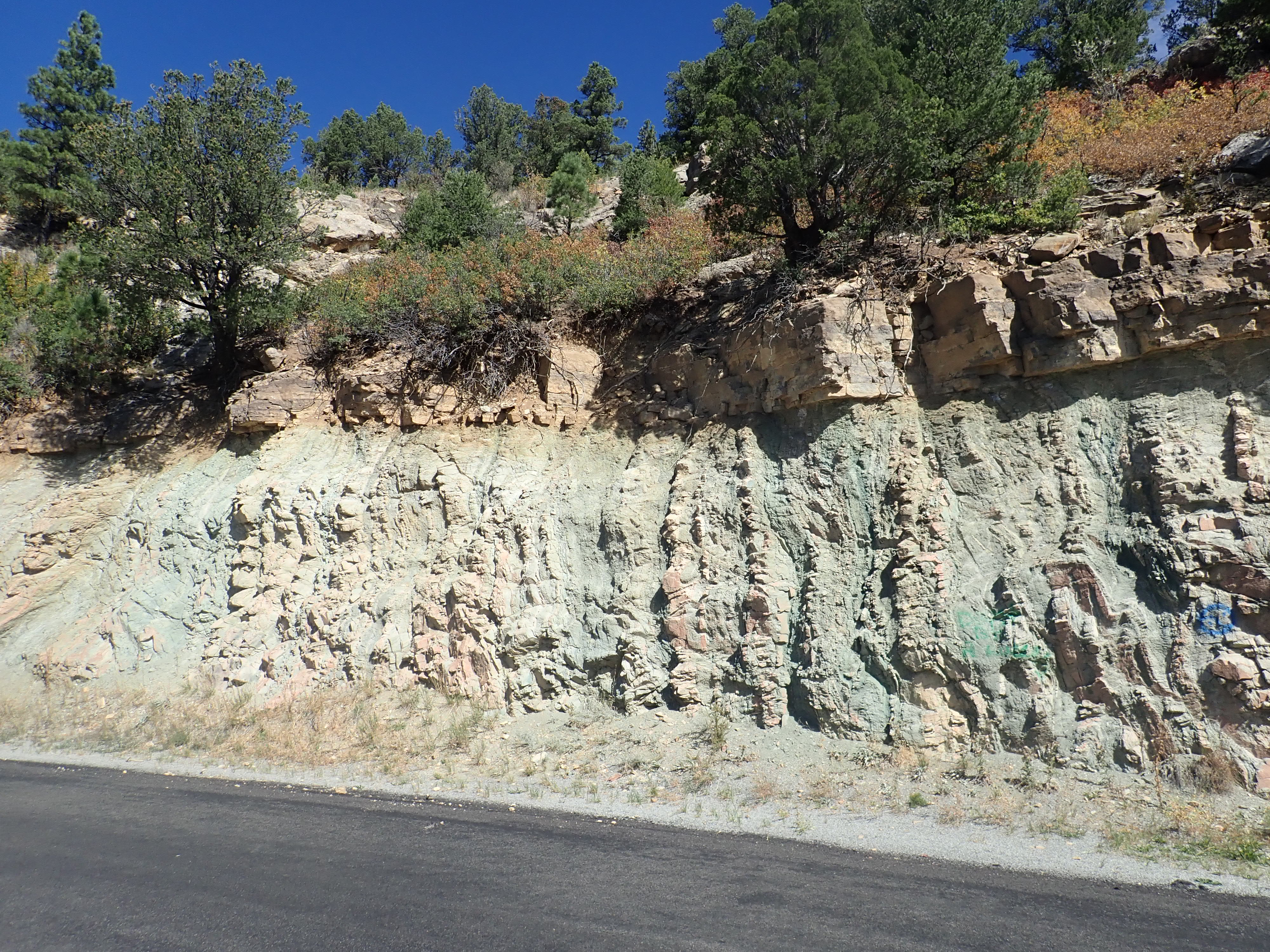
An exposure of the Great Unconformity, west of Montezuma, New Mexico

=== Frenchman Mountain, Nevada ===
A prominent exposure of the Great Unconformity occurs in Frenchman Mountain in Nevada. Frenchman Mountain exposes a sequence of Phanerozoic strata equivalent to those found in the Grand Canyon. At the base of this sequence, the Great Unconformity, with the Tapeats Sandstone of the Tonto Group overlying the Vishnu Basement Rocks, is well-exposed in a manner that is atypical and scientifically significant in its combination of extent and accessibility. This exposure is frequently illustrated in popular and educational publications, and is often part of geological fieldtrips. There is a gap of about 1.2 billion years where 550-million-year-old strata of the Tapeats Sandstone rests on 1.7-billion-year-old Vishnu Basement Rocks.

== Possible causes of the Great Unconformity ==
There is currently no widely accepted explanation for the Great Unconformity among geoscientists. There are hypotheses that have been proposed; it is widely accepted that there was a combination of events which may have caused such an extensive phenomenon. One example is a large glaciation event which took place during the Neoproterozoic, starting around 720 million years ago. This is also when a significant glaciation event known as Snowball Earth occurred. Snowball Earth periods covered almost the entire planet with ice. The areas that underwent glaciation were approximately those where the Great Unconformity is located today. When glaciers move, they drag and erode sediment away from the underlying rock. This would explain how a large section of rock was taken away from widespread areas around the same time.

A potential link has been proposed between such sub-Cambrian unconformities and glacial erosion during the Neoproterozoic Snowball Earth glaciations. Alternatively, it has been proposed that multiple smaller events, such as the formation and breakup of Rodinia, created many unconformities worldwide.

== See also ==
- Geology of the Grand Canyon area (with time scale)
- List of orogenies
- Orogeny (mountain building)
