= Sixtymile Formation =

Cambrian geologic formation found in Grand Canyon, Arizona

- Stratigraphic range: Cambrian, 527–509 Ma
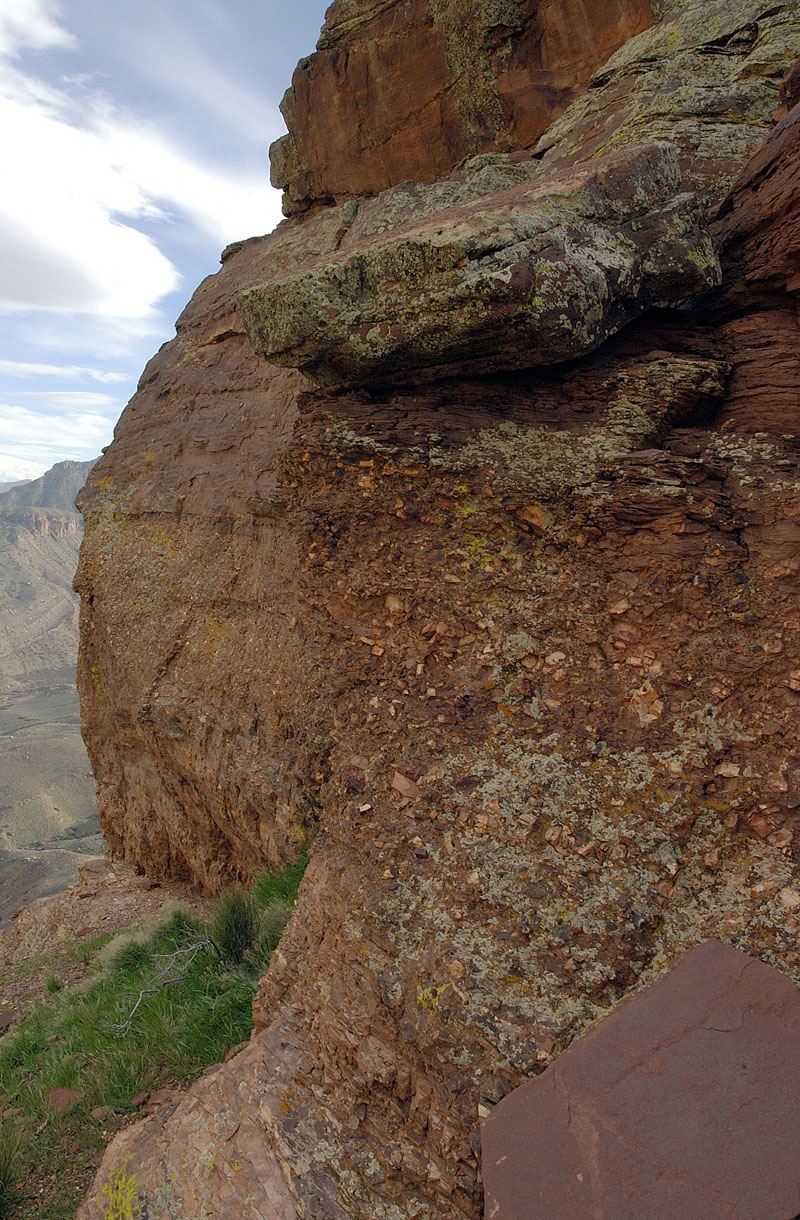
- Sixtymile Formation in Grand Canyon
- Type: Geological formation
- Unit of: Tonto Group
- Underlies: Tapeats Sandstone
- Overlies: Chuar Group
- Thickness: 60 m (200 ft), at maximum

Lithology
- Primary: siltstone and sandstone
- Other: intraformational breccia

Location
- Region: Northern Arizona
- Country: United States
- Extent: the Chuar syncline, Grand Canyon

Type section
- Named by: Ford et al. (1972), Ford and Breed (1973), and Elston (1979)

The Sixtymile Formation is a very thin accumulation of sandstone, siltstone, and breccia underlying the Tapeats Sandstone that is exposed in only four places in the Chuar Valley. These exposures occur atop Nankoweap Butte and within Awatubi and Sixtymile Canyons in the eastern Grand Canyon, Arizona. The maximum preserved thickness of the Sixtymile Formation is about 60 m (200 ft). The actual depositional thickness of the Sixtymile Formation is unknown owing to erosion prior to deposition of the Tapeats Sandstone.

Sixtymile Formation and the underlying Chuar Group are preserved only in a broad asymmetric fold comprising both units, called the Chuar syncline. The Chuar Syncline is a doubly plunging fold, which means that along the hingeline within the axis of the syncline, beds in some areas (Nankoweap Canyon) dip toward the south, and in other areas (Lava Chuar Canyon), beds dip toward the north. The Sixtymile Formation, Chuar Group, and Chuar Syncline is bounded on the east by the Butte fault zone and on all other sides by the overlying Tapeats Sandstone. The hingeline of the Chuar Syncline parallels the trace of the Butte fault, suggesting a genetic relationship between the syncline and the fault.

In descending order, the Sixtymile Formation is underlain by the Chuar Group, Nankoweap Formation, and the Unkar Group. The Unkar Group lies unconformably upon deeply eroded granites, gneisses, pegmatites, and schists of the Vishnu Basement Rocks. The Nankoweap and Sixtymile formations together with the Chuar and Unkar groups comprise the Grand Canyon Supergroup.

== Nomenclature ==
The Sixtymile Formation of Chuar Group was first recognized by Ford and Breed (1972). It was formally named the Sixty Mile Formation and was regarded to be the upper formation of Chuar Group of Grand Canyon Supergroup by Ford and Breed (1973). They designated the type locality of the Sixtymile Formation to be outcrops of red to white sandstone and siltstone with chert and interformational breccia exposed by cliffs on the north side of the upper part of Sixtymile Canyon. Later, in 1979, its spelling was changed to Sixtymile. In 2001, Timmons and others reassigned what had been identified as the lowest part of the Sixtymile Formation to the underlying Kwagunt Formation. The age of the Sixtymile Formation was regarded to be Precambrian until 2018, when dating of detrital zircons from it determined it to be Cambrian in age and, as a result, it is assigned to the lowermost formation of the Tonto Group.

== Description ==
The Sixtymile Formation is typically subdivided into three informal members. They are (1) a lower red siltstone, sandstone, and breccia member; (2) a middle cherty quartzite member; and (3) an upper breccia-bearing sandstone and conglomerate member. The lower member, which is 22 m (72 ft) to 27 m (89 ft) thick, consists of beds of a heterogeneous mixture of laminated hematitic sandstone; thin-bedded micaceous sandstone containing rock fragments; monomict and polymict breccia; crudely bedded sandstone; and thin-bedded soft sandy siltstone. Individual beds are discontinuous and local in extent and often grade into each other. Blocks of dolomite from the underlying Walcott Member often occur in the lower member.

The Middle Member. which is about 25 m (82 ft) thick, of the Sixtymile Formation consists of thin bedded, finely laminated, very fine grained cherty quartzite. The laminated quartzite of the Middle Member is folded on a moderately large scale. The thin beds and laminations of it are crinkled in a manner that reflects slumping of the member toward the axis of the Chuar Syncline. Chert is common to abundant within the Middle Member. The middle of this member contains numerous thin discontinuous beds of chalky-white chert. The lower part of the Middle Member is purplish red, which grades upward to a creamy, mottled-and-streaked red. This member is resistant to erosion and characteristically forms cliffs. This member forms small hills within its upper contact on either side of the Chuar Syncline. The upper contact of the Middle Member with the overlying Upper Member is sharp and unconformable. The basal sandstones of the Upper Member cut about 1.5 m (4.9 ft) into the beds of the middle member. In inaccessible exposures, conglomerate of the Upper Member appears to unconformably overly the middle member.

The Upper Member of the Sixtymile Formation, which is about 12 m (39 ft), consists of fine-grained fluvial and fanglomeratic sandstone that grades abruptly into sandy conglomerate toward the axis of the syncline. It is only preserved in a narrow trough-shaped area in the center of the Chuar Syncline. The sandstone is pale red to brown, and contains scattered rock fragments. These rock fragments include chalky-white chert derived from the middle member. Some of the sandstone exhibits fluvial crossbedding and is fanglomeratic. Massive weathering maroon conglomerate is present in the lower part of the Upper Member. It grades laterally into the sandstone.

== Contacts ==
The basal contact of the Walcott Member with the overlying Sixtymile Formation is conformable. Typically, the contact between the underlying black shale typical of the Walcott and overlying basal red sandstones of the Sixtymile Formation consists of a 1.5 m (4.9 ft) interval that is gradational in nature. The transition beds and the basal laminated red sandstone of the Sixtymile Formation lack any fragmental or exotic debris, unlike the overlying strata. These field relations thus indicate that deposition was continuous across the Chuar Group–Sixtymile boundary.

The upper contact of the Sixtymile Formation is a disconformity that laterally becomes an angular unconformity. Within the center of the Chuar Syncline, this upper contact is a disconformity. Away from the center, the strata of the Sixtymile Formation, an angular discordance between the formations of 6° to 10° can be seen. This unconformity has an irregular hilly surface. In case of the Sixtymile Formation, a small amount of relief, 20 m (66 ft) to 30 m (98 ft), in the Sixtymile Canyon area was the result of resistance to erosion of the Middle Member of the Sixtymile Formation (fig. 4). Local erosion removed all of the Upper Member of the Sixtymile from all but the central part of the Chuar syncline prior to the deposition of the Tapeats Sandstone

== Fossils ==
No fossils have been reported from the Sixtymile Formation.

== Depositional environment ==
The strata of the Sixtymile Formation records the accumulation of sediments adjacent to an active fault scarp. The sandstones and siltstones of the Lower Member are inferred to have accumulated within a lake occupying a basin formed by subsidence of the Chuar Syncline. The breccias and blocks of dolomite are regarded to be landslide deposits created by the collapse of an active fault scarp associated with the Butte fault zone. The sediments of the Middle Member are inferred to have accumulated in standing water, presumably a lake along the axis of the Chuar syncline as indicated by its very fine grain size, the thin regular bedding, and its bedded chert. The Upper Member consists of fine-grained fluvial and fanglomeratic sandstone and conglomerate that were deposited by a stream that once flowed along the trough of the Chuar Syncline. The Sixtymile Formation provides dramatic evidence of active faulting along the Butte fault system.

== Age ==
In 2000, the radiometric dating of volcanic ash within the uppermost Walcott Member of the Chuar Group, 1 m (3.3 ft) below the base of the Sixtymile Formation provided a maximum age for its deposition. The U-Pb date of seven zircon fractions, including four single grains, yielded a date of 742±6 million years ago. Thus, the Sixtymile Formation accumulated after 742±6 Ma.

However, in 2018, the dating of detrital zircons by Karl Karlstrom established that the Sixtymile Formation as being Cambrian in age, between 520 and 509 million years old. Thus, the Sixtymile Formation accumulated in lacustrine, fluvial, and shallow marine environment and are preserved within narrow, fault-controlled basins contemporaneous with the accumulation strata of the lower Tonto Group in the western Grand Canyon and Lake Mead regions. As a result, the Sixtymile Formation can be considered a member of the Tonto Group.

== See also ==
- Geology of the Grand Canyon area

== Popular Publications ==
- Blakey, Ron and Wayne Ranney, Ancient Landscapes of the Colorado Plateau, Grand Canyon Association (publisher), 2008, 176 pages, ISBN 978-1934656037
- Chronic, Halka. Roadside Geology of Arizona, Mountain Press Publishing Co., 1983, 23rd printing, pp. 229–232, ISBN 978-0878421473
- Lucchitta, Ivo, Hiking Arizona's Geology, 2001, Mountaineers's Books, ISBN 0898867304
