= List of Supai Group prominences in the Grand Canyon =

This is a list of Supai Group prominences in the Grand Canyon. Landforms with up to 4 units of Supai Group, as prominences.

The rock unit sequences are as follows:

- Coconino Sandstone, (prominence, Permian unit)
- Hermit Shale, Permian
- Supai Group, (4 units, Pennsylvanian-Permian)
  - 4 – Esplanade Sandstone, (Permian)
    (Typically forms a resistant (& thick) cliff, thickening in Western Grand Canyon)
  - 3 – Wescogame Formation
  - 2 – Manakacha Formation, (a resistant cliff-former; can make cliffs, or cliffs, with a platform on prominence)
  - 1 – Watahomigi Formation
- (localized-Surprise Canyon Formation)
- Redwall Limestone-cliff-former (and platform-former)

== Supai Group (4 units) ==
Supai Group prominence
Landform	Location	__Notes__	Images
Whites Butte	(near start of)- West Grand Canyon	remainder debris of Supai Group; Wata- homigi Formation	Whites Butte

== Supai Group, Esplanade Sandstone (unit 4) ==
Supai Group prominence Esplanade Sandstone (unit 4)
Landform	Location	__Notes__	Images
Cardenas Butte Thor Temple	East South Rim Central Grand Canyon	butte on ridgeline platform of Esplanade (with debris remainders?)	Cardenas Butte Thor Temple

== Supai Group, Manakacha Formation ==
Manakacha Formation prominence
Landform	Location	Notes	Images
Dana Butte Scorpion Ridge The Howlands Butte Whites Butte	Central-East; Grand Canyon (beginning)- West Grand Canyon Central Grand Canyon (start of)-West Grand Canyon		Dana Butte Scorpion Ridge The Howlands Butte Whites Butte

== Supai Group, Watahomigi Formation ==
Supai Group prominence
Landform	Location	__Notes__	Images
Geikie Peak	(near start of)- West Grand Canyon	remainder (pyramidal) slopes Wata- homigi Formation	Geikie Peak

== Coconino Sandstone cliffs on Supai (#4)-Esplanade Sandstone platform ==
The cliff-former (and a platform-former) Esplanade Sandstone supports cliffs of Coconino Sandstone, the cliffs being on slope-former Hermit Shale, then the Esplanade Sandstone platform.

- Angels Gate
- Brady Peak
- Jupiter Temple
- Mount Hayden
- Siegfried Pyre
- Tritle Peak

== Alphabetical listing ==
- Cardenas Butte
- Dana Butte
- Geikie Peak
- Scorpion Ridge
- The Howlands Butte
- Thor Temple
- Whites Butte

== See also ==
- Geology of the Grand Canyon area
