= The Howlands Butte =

Summit in Coconino County, Arizona

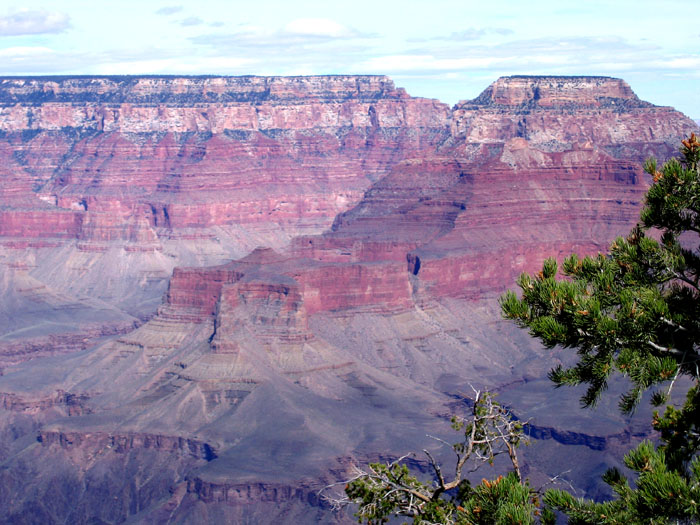
- Clear Creek Canyon-(left) & The Howlands Butte-(center) (Wotans Throne prominence behind)

Highest point
- Elevation: 5,572 ft (1,698 m)
- Prominence: 672 ft (205 m)
- Parent peak: Angels Gate
- Coordinates: 36°05′45″N 112°00′34″W

Geography
- Location within Arizona
- Location: Grand Canyon; Coconino County, Arizona. U.S.
- Topo map: USGS Phantom Ranch

Geology
- Rock age: Pennsylvanian
- Mountain type: sedimentary
- Rock types: (remainder shelf-(cliff)) of Manakacha Formation, on slopes of Watahomigi Formation, upon (thin)-Surprise Canyon Formation, on platform of Redwall Limestone and Supai Group, Surprise Canyon Formation, Redwall Limestone, Temple Butte Formation (Tonto Group- 3-units) _3-Muav Limestone, _2-Bright Angel Shale, _1-Tapeats Sandstone; Vishnu Basement Rocks, (Metamorphic Rocks)

Climbing
- Easiest route: class 4 climbing

The Howlands Butte, elevation 5,572 feet (1,698 m), is a minor butte in the southeast drainage of the very large Clear Creek drainage. Clear Creek is a medium length flowing creek, just upstream of the major Bright Angel Creek outfall into the Colorado River, Granite Gorge. The Howlands Butte was officially named in 1932 for brothers Seneca and Oramel G. Howland, members of the Powell Geographic Expedition of 1869. Just two days from the expedition's intended destination, the pair and William H. Dunn left the expedition, fearing they could not survive the dangers of the river much longer. They hiked out of the canyon and were never seen again. Separation Rapids on the river is where they departed from Powell.

== Gallery ==
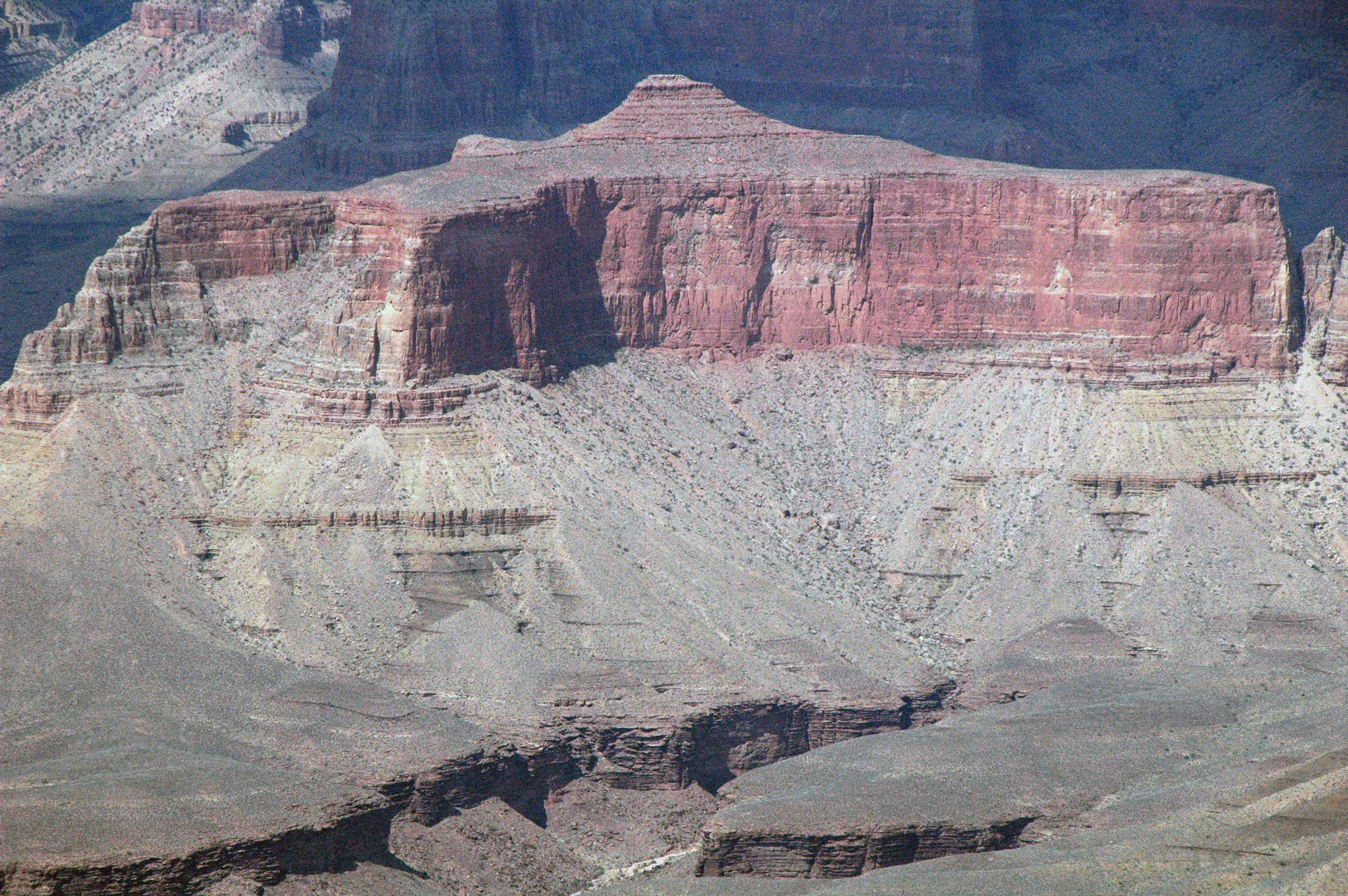
Howlands Butte, south aspect

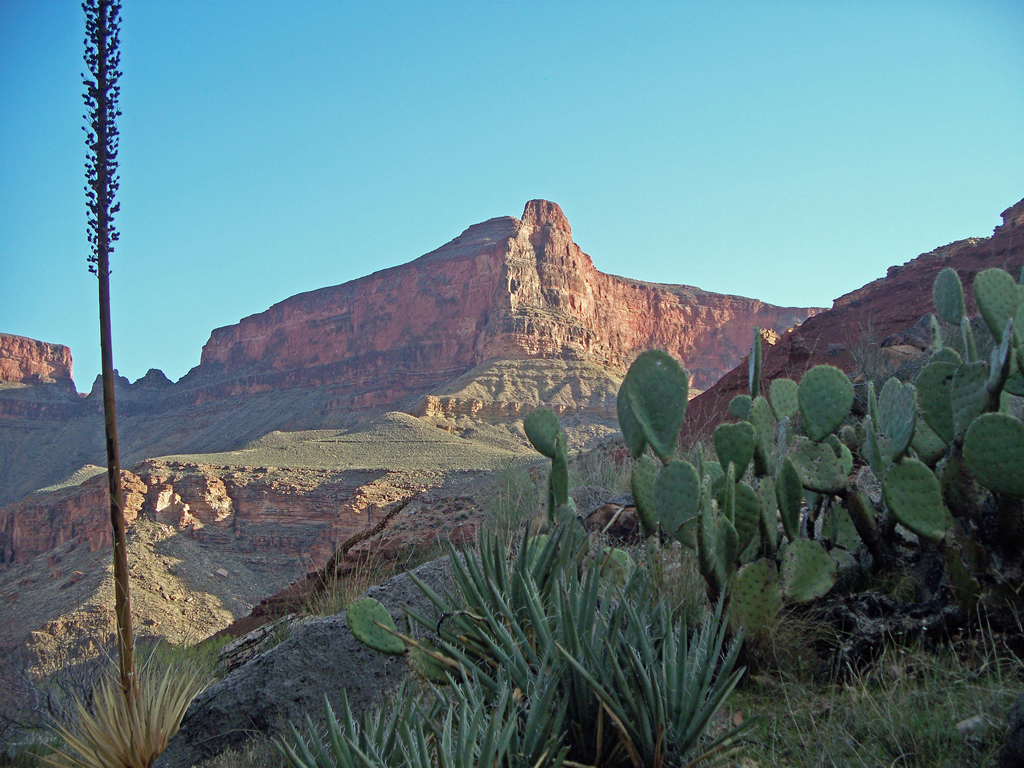
The Howlands Butte viewed from northwest on Clear Creek Trail

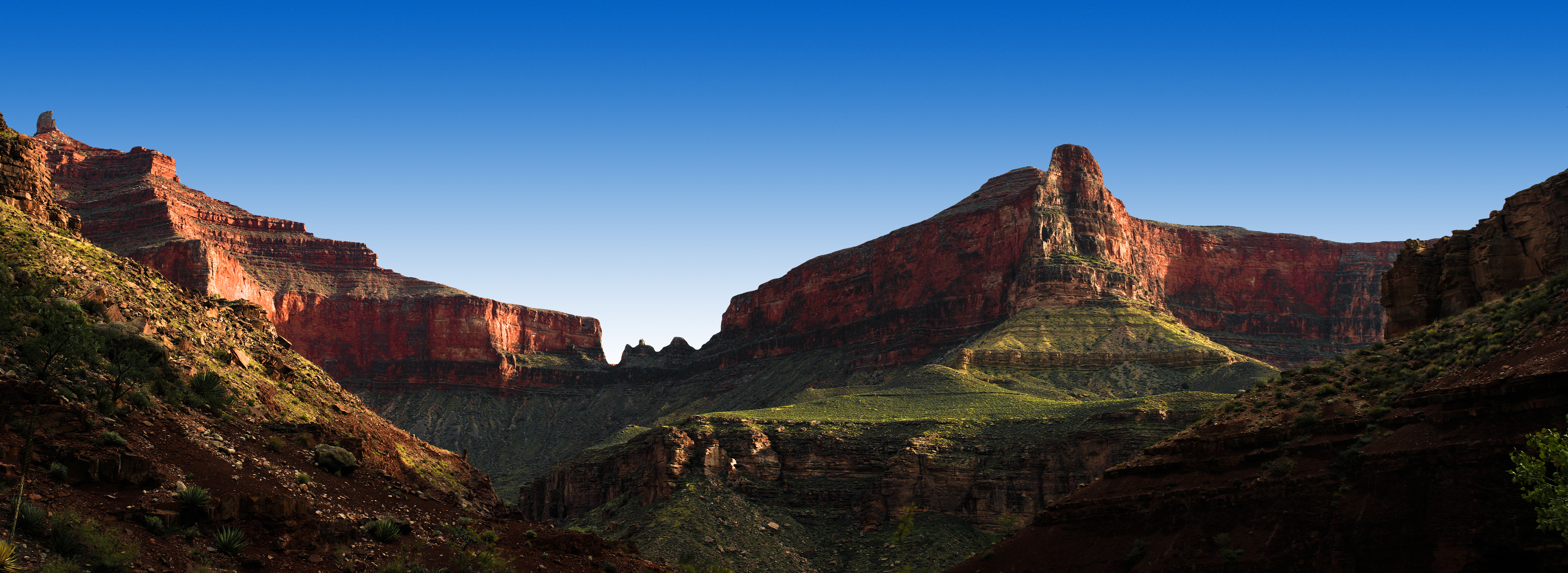
Angels Gate (left) and The Howlands Butte (right) from northwest

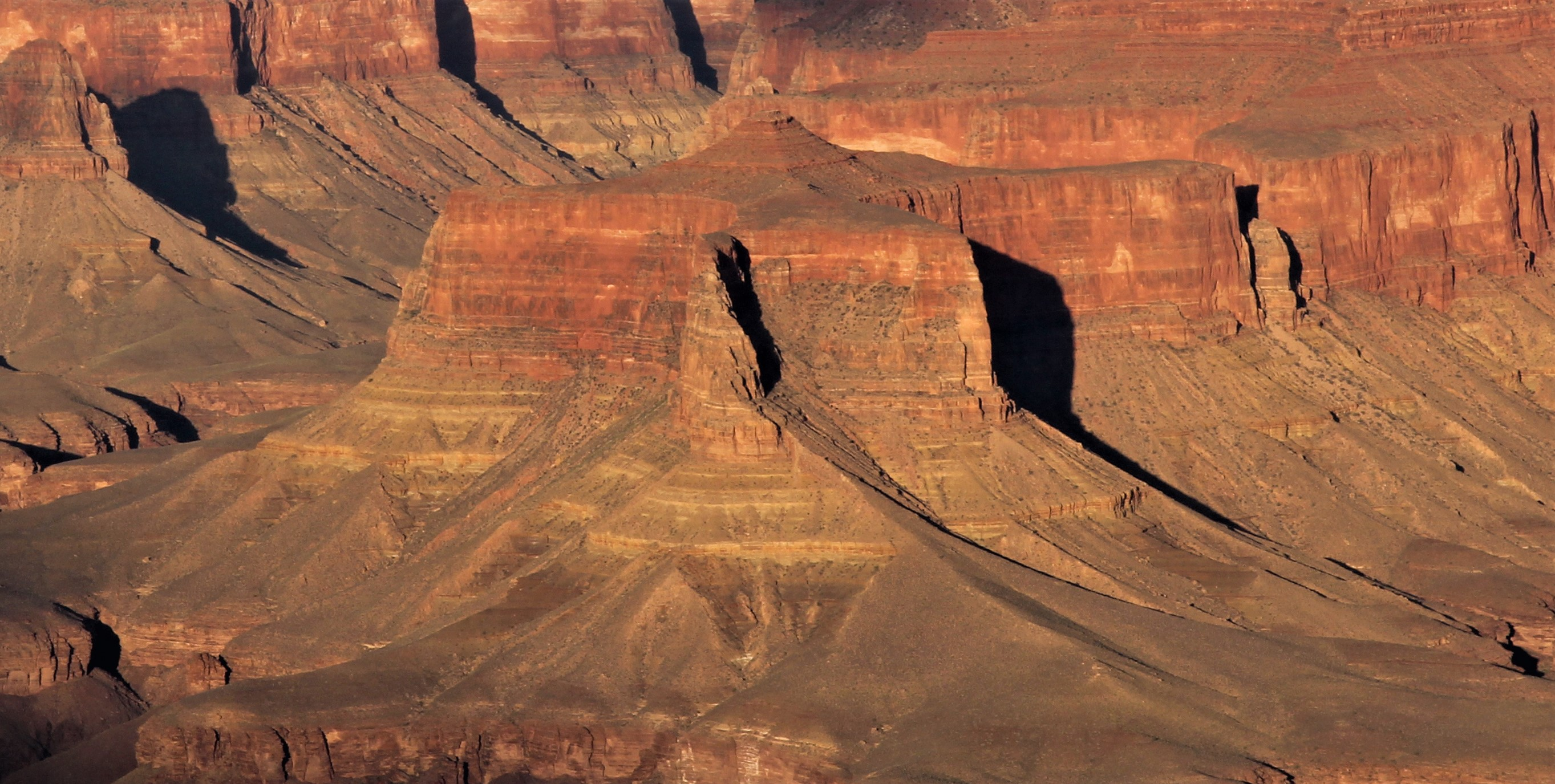
The Howlands Butte

== Geology ==
The geology of The Howlands Butte is relatively obvious, being that is a cliff-former massif of the Redwall Limestone. Interestingly, two rock units, commonly thin layers, are found, one on top of the Redwall platform (a cliff-former result of non-easily erodible rock), the other under the Redwall, on another platform, the Muav Limestone. The Surprise Canyon Formation is on top; the Temple Butte Limestone is below.

The prominence of The Howlands Butte is a remainder cliff (or shelf) of cliff-former, unit 2-of-4 Supai Group, the Manakacha Formation. It sits on slope-former Watahomigi Formation. And both Supai units sit on debris, and a remaining-layer of Surprise Canyon Formation.

The Tonto Group units are below, and then Basement rocks are found at Granite Gorge.

== See also ==
- Geology of the Grand Canyon area
- Dunn Butte
- List of Supai Group prominences in the Grand Canyon
