= Dana Butte =

Landform in the Grand Canyon

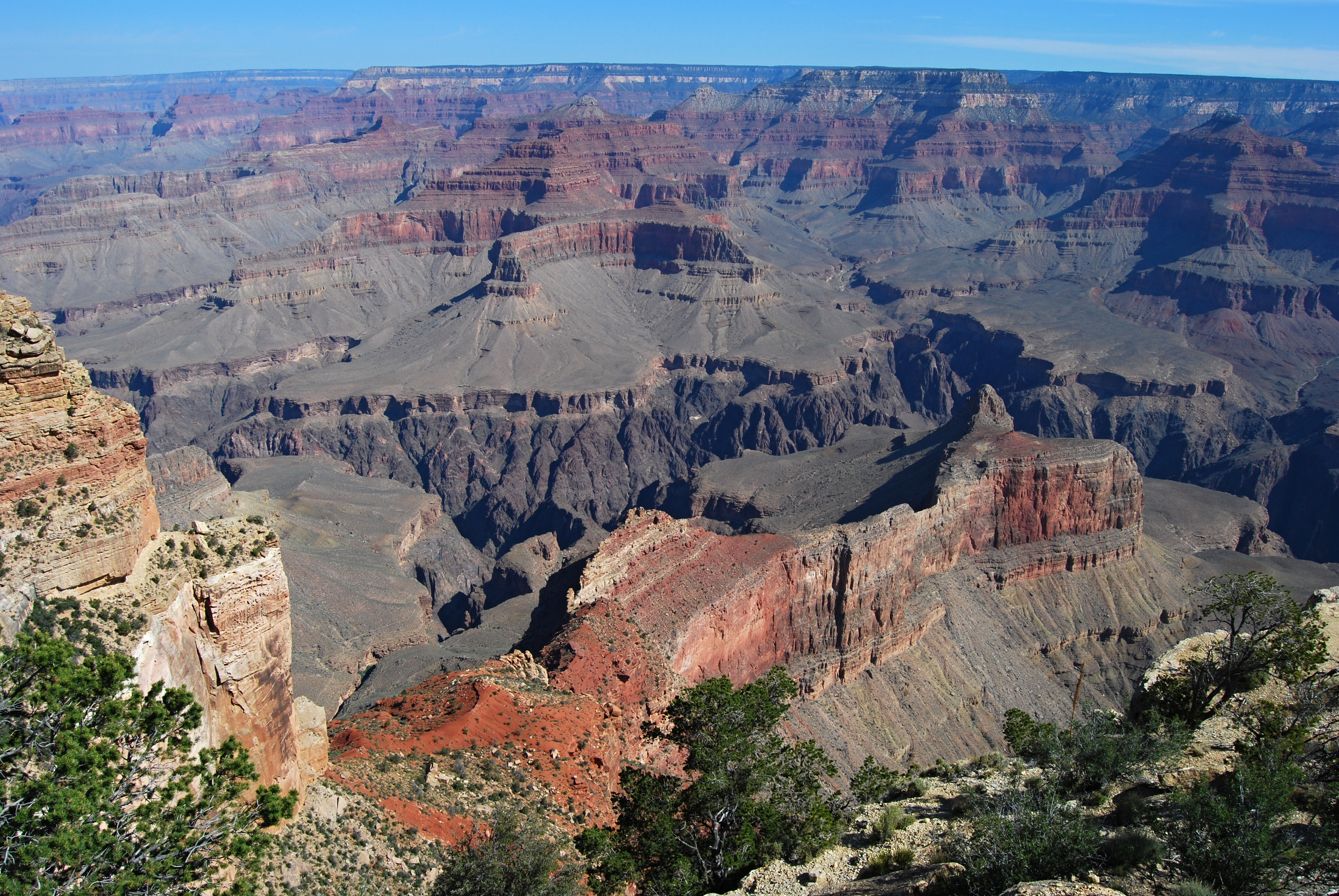

Highest point
- Elevation: 4,964 ft (1,513 m)
- Prominence: 300 ft (91 m)
- Parent peak: Hopi Point (South Rim)
- Isolation: 2
- Coordinates: 36°05′29″N 112°09′02″W

Geography
- Location within Arizona Location within the United States
- Location: Grand Canyon; Coconino County, Arizona. U.S.
- Topo map: USPS Grand Canyon

Geology
- Rock age: Pennsylvanian
- Mountain type: sedimentary rock:
- Rock type(s): Manakacha Formation; Watahomigi Formation; Redwall Limestone; Tonto Group _3-Muav Limestone _2-Bright Angel Shale _1-Tapeats Sandstone; Vishnu Basement Rocks; Granitic (Xg). Metamorphic Rocks (Xm)

Dana Butte is a 4,964-foot (1,513 m) prominence adjacent to the course of the Colorado River in the Grand Canyon and sits on the south side of Granite Gorge. Named for geologist and volcanologist James Dwight Dana, the butte is roughly 2.5 miles (4.0 km) north-northwest of Grand Canyon Village of the central Grand Canyon, and lies about 2.0 miles (3.2 km) due north of Pima Point (South Rim).

The butte lies at the end of a higher elevation bright-red, very narrow Supai Group ridgeline, and the spire of Dana Butte sits on the cliff-former Redwall Limestone that creates not only massive cliffs, but platforms that support younger rock units above. Dana Butte's prominence spire is dull gray, sitting on gray debris on the platform, and is composed of weathered Supai Group Manakacha Formation, also a cliff-former rock. Dana Butte drains west into the Salt Creek (Grand Canyon) drainage, and east into the adjacent canyon of the terminus of Salt Creek.

== See also ==
- Geology of the Grand Canyon area
- The Alligator (Grand Canyon)
- The Battleship (Grand Canyon)
