= Wescogame Formation =

Geological formation in the Grand Canyon

- Stratigraphic range: Upper Pennsylvanian, 312–300 Ma
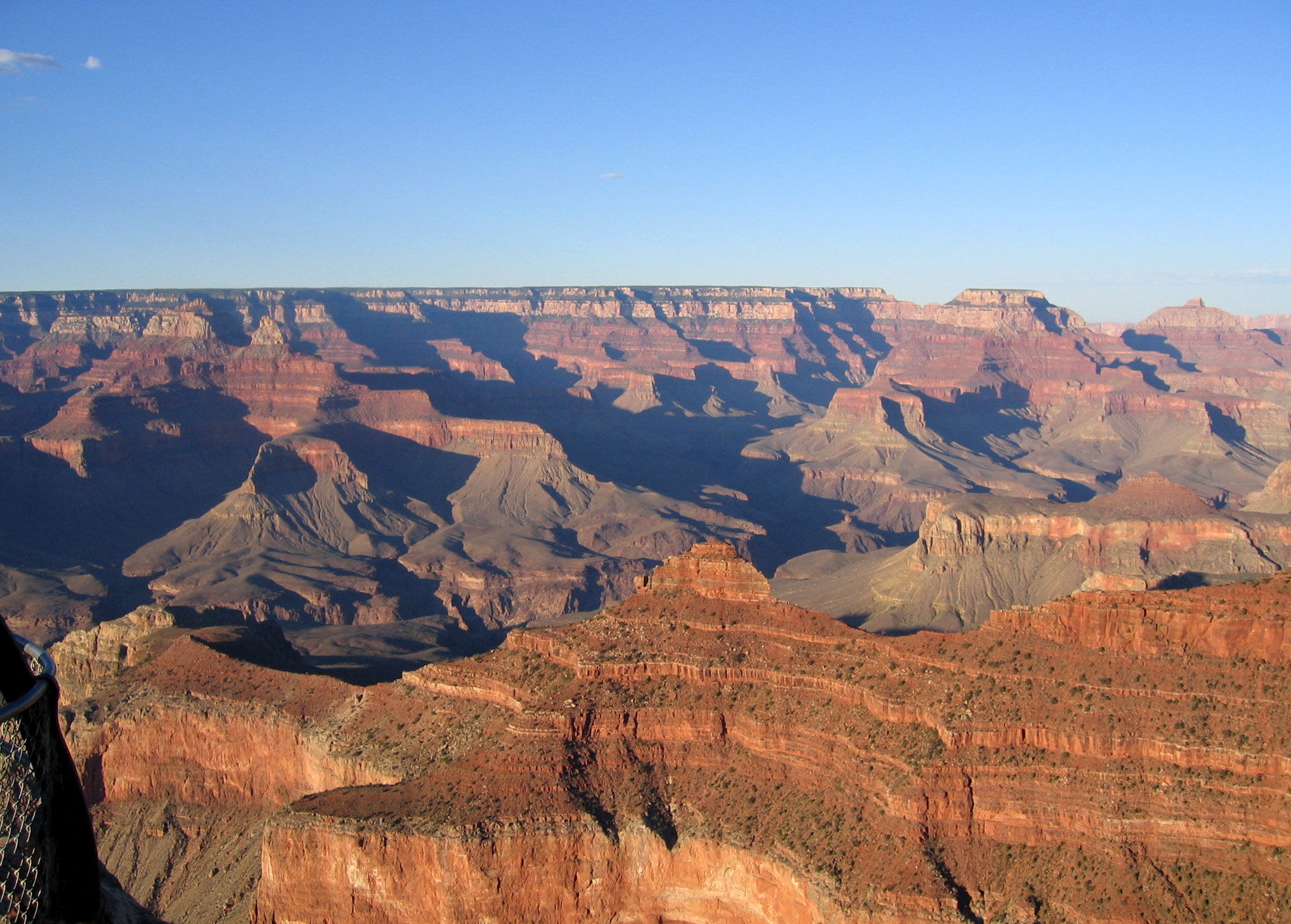
- representative Supai Group 'redbeds' (ridgeline extending north from South Rim, Grand Canyon)
- Type: Geologic unit
- Unit of: Supai Group
- Underlies: Esplanade Sandstone, (4th member)-Supai Group
- Overlies: Manakacha Formation, (2nd member)-Supai Group-312 Ma
- Thickness: 200 feet (61 m) max (100–200 ft typical)

Lithology
- Primary: sandstone, siltstone

Location
- Region: Colorado Plateau, southwest and south
- Extent: Grand Canyon, Verde Valley, and basement rocks of Mogollon Rim and central & east-northeast Arizona

The (Upper) Late Pennsylvanian Wescogame Formation is a slope-forming, sandstone, red-orange geologic unit, formed from an addition of eolian sand, added to marine transgression deposits (siltstones, etc.), and found throughout sections of the Grand Canyon, in Arizona, Southwest United States. It is one of the upper members of the Supai Group 'redbeds' (member three of four major units), with the Supai Group found in other sections of Arizona, especially in the Verde Valley region, or as a basement unit below the Mogollon Rim, just eastwards or part of the basement Supai Group of the southwest & south Colorado Plateau.

Coeval units of Wescogame Formation and the Supai Group are replaced by geologic units formed from geology deposited in relationship to the former basin to the south-southeast in Arizona, the Pedregosa Basin, of the Pedregosa Sea, which extended northeast to the Verde Valley region, and the earlier deposition of the red rock sandstone of the Schnebly Hill Formation, of the Sedona, Arizona region, (Oak Creek Canyon, Sycamore Canyon, and other related sub-regions).

== Geologic sequence ==
The Late Pennsylvanian-Early Permian geologic sequence of the Supai Group common in the Grand Canyon: The Pennsylvanian is the Late Carboniferous.

- Supai Group
  - 4 – Esplanade Sandstone-(Early Permian)
    - 3B – (Pakoon Limestone at west Grand Canyon & Nevada)
  - 3 – Wescogame Formation-(Late Pennsylvanian)
  - 2 – Manakacha Formation
  - 1 – Watahomigi Formation

The Supai Group members were created from marine (oceanic) sequences of marine transgression, and regression, thus the alternating sandstone, siltstones, conglomerate subsections (facies); the subsections are not always a continuous transition into the above section, mostly due to ocean levels, falling, or rising, glaciation, or regional subsidence-(basins, etc.) or uplift of land. Today's Wasatch Front is the approximate lineage, NNE to SSW of the western coast region of North America from where the oceans transgressed. The ancient Antler Mountains-(Antler orogeny, off-shore volcanic island arch(es)), of ancient Nevada supplied material, from the west, off the 'ancestral' West Coast. The continent supplied material from the east, both directions supplying the offshore basin, the Cordilleran Basin which became part of the Basin and Range Province, in later epochs. Three other basins were involved in this history: southwest of the Ancestral Rocky Mountains was the Paradox Basin-(eastern Utah to Southwest Colorado), northeast was the Central Colorado Basin-(NW Colorado, NE Utah, SW Wyoming); the Oquirrh Basin was north-northwest, at present day northwest Utah.

=== Supai Group and Hermosa Group, coeval units ===
The approximate coeval Supai and Hermosa Groups, Arizona, Utah, and northwest Colorado:

Arizona – Grand Canyon & central-northeast AZ	Utah – east & southeast	Uncom- compahgre Uplift	(northeast)-UT (northwest)-CO (proto)–Uintah Basin region
Supai Group; ~340–(330) to 285 Ma	Hermosa Group	"Ancestral Rocky Mtns" (eroded to sea level, 165 Ma)	Hermosa Group
4 - Esplanade Sandstone-(Grand Canyon & Verde Valley region)	Cedar Mesa Sandstone	"Ancestral Rocky Mtns"	xxxxxxx
3B-Pakoon Limestone-(west)-Grand Canyon, & NV	Elephant Canyon Formation-(east & southeast) Utah	"Ancestral Rocky Mtns"	Hermosa members?
3-Wescogame Formation	(Hermosa)	"Ancestral Rocky Mtns"	Hermosa members?
2-Manakacha Formation	(Hermosa)	"Ancestral Rocky Mtns"	Hermosa members?
1-Watahomigi Formation	(Hermosa)	"Ancestral Rocky Mtns"	Hermosa members?
		Uncom- compahgre Uplift

Because marine transgressions cover distances, over time, the coeval units are separated by distance, and type of deposition material; the local subsidence, or uplift, as well as glaciation, and sea level changes, can cause variations in the deposition sequences of transgression-regressions. The ocean was to the west of the proto-North American continent, but also northwest, or southwest.

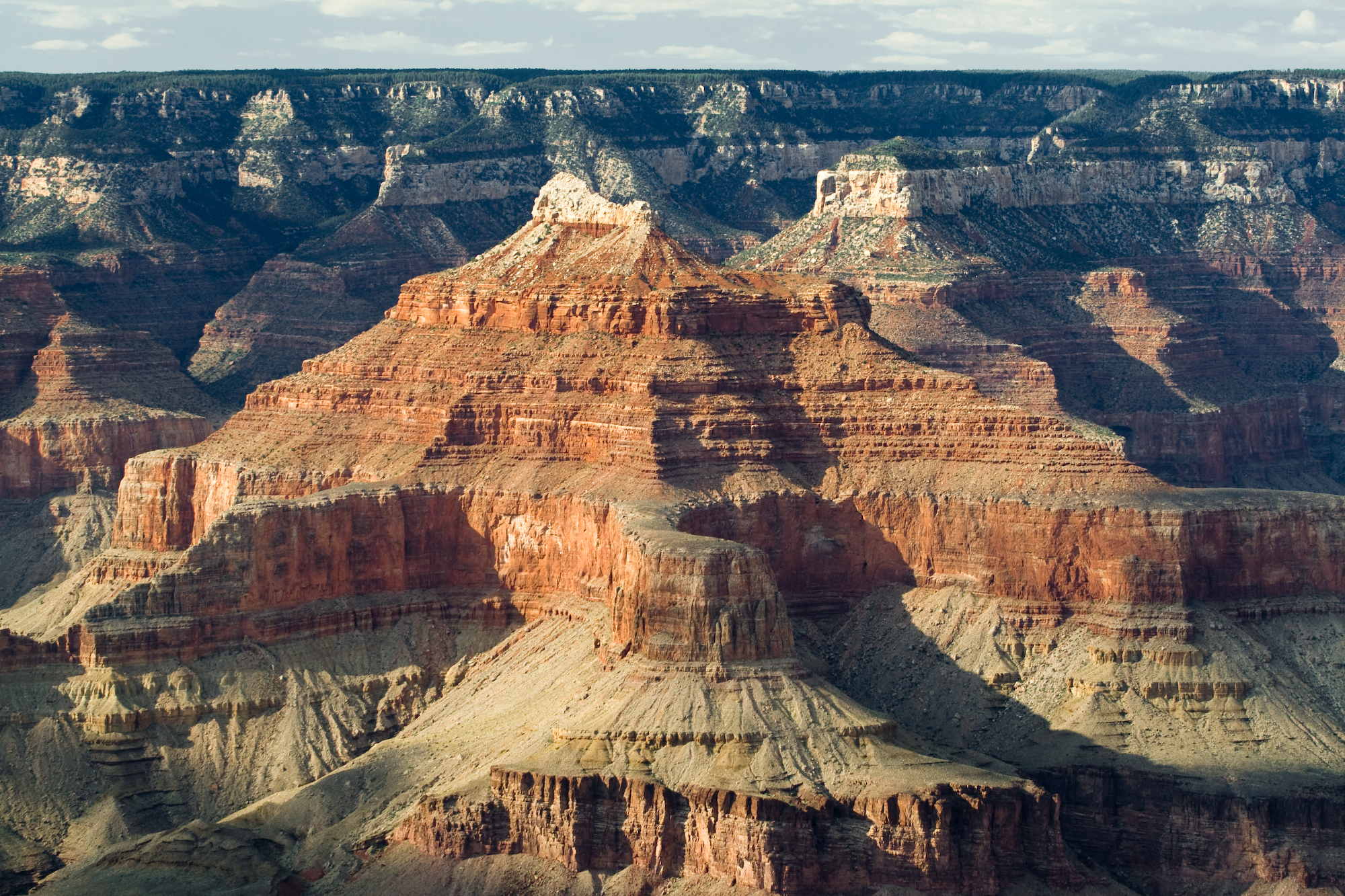
Wescogame Formation slopes directly below upper-vertical-cliff of Esplanade Sandstone-(below Hermit Formation and white Coconino Sandstone prominence).
Isis Temple, with complete Supai Group for Grand Canyon; (Pakoon Limestone miles westward in Grand Canyon, and Nevada)

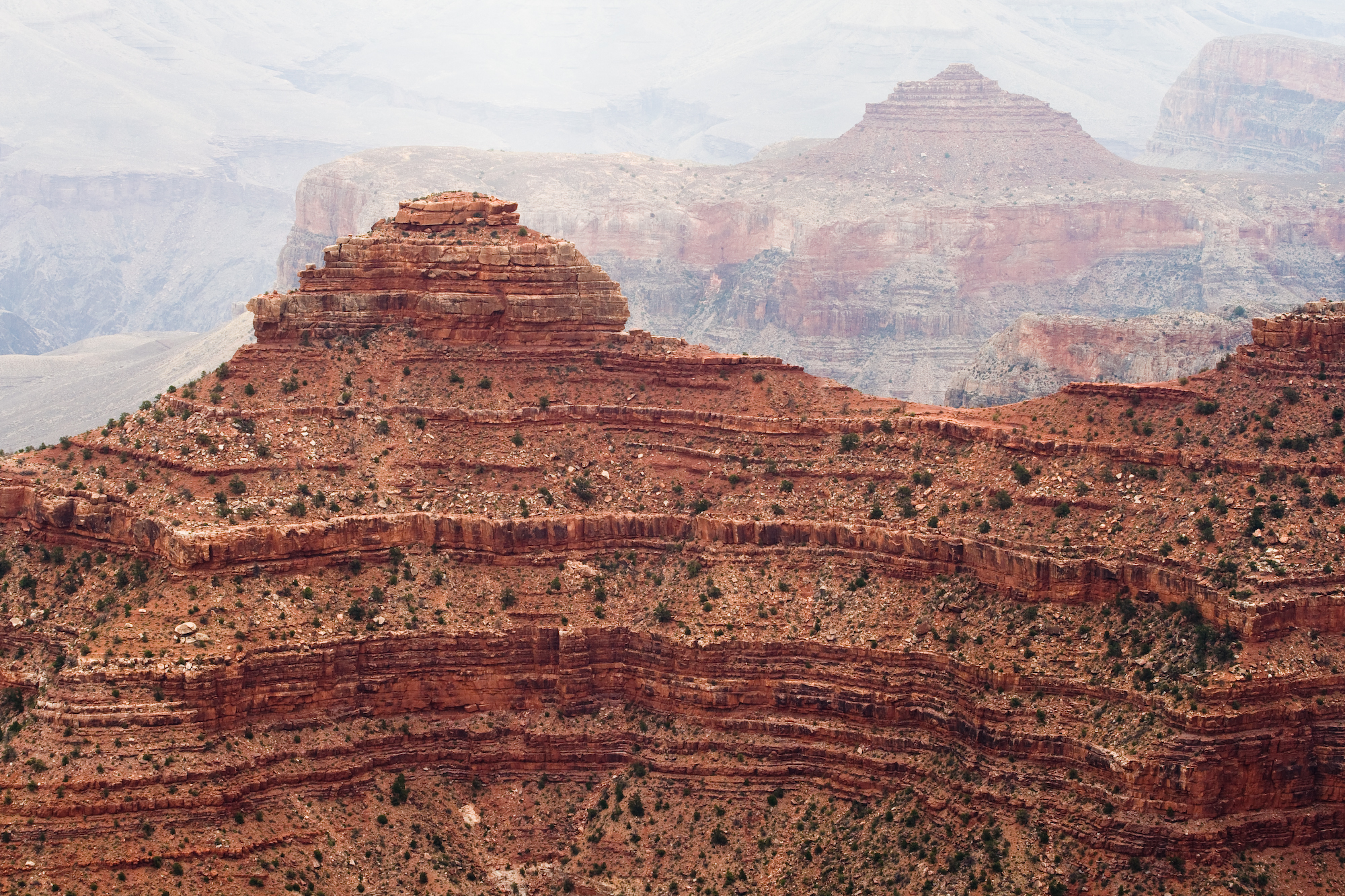
Close-up of 'redbeds'

== Fossil footprints ==
Fossil footprints were first discovered in the area in 1915 by Charles Schuchert. Charles Gilmore visited the Grand Canyon area during the 1920s to collect specimens of these footprints for the Smithsonian Institution. He also wanted to create an exhibit and interpretive center for Paleozoic tracks like these at Hermit Trail. Lockley and Hunt (1995) described Gilmore's work as "successful" and he ended by publishing several papers about the local footprints including those from the Early Permian Hermit Shale and the Middle Permian Coconino Sandstone.

== See also ==
- Marine transgression
