= Mount Zoar =

Mountain in New York, United States

- Location within New York Location within the United States

Highest point
- Elevation: 2,733 feet (833 m)
- Coordinates: 42°20′11″N 74°10′26″W

Geography
- Location: Windham, New York, U.S.
- Topo map: USGS Hensonville

Mount Zoar is a mountain located in the Catskill Mountains of New York northeast of Windham. Kate Hill is located east-southeast, Ginseng Mountain is located west-northwest, and Mount Hayden is located northwest of Mount Zoar.
