= Esplanade Sandstone =

Geologic unit found in the Grand Canyon

- Stratigraphic range: Lower Permian, 290–287 Ma
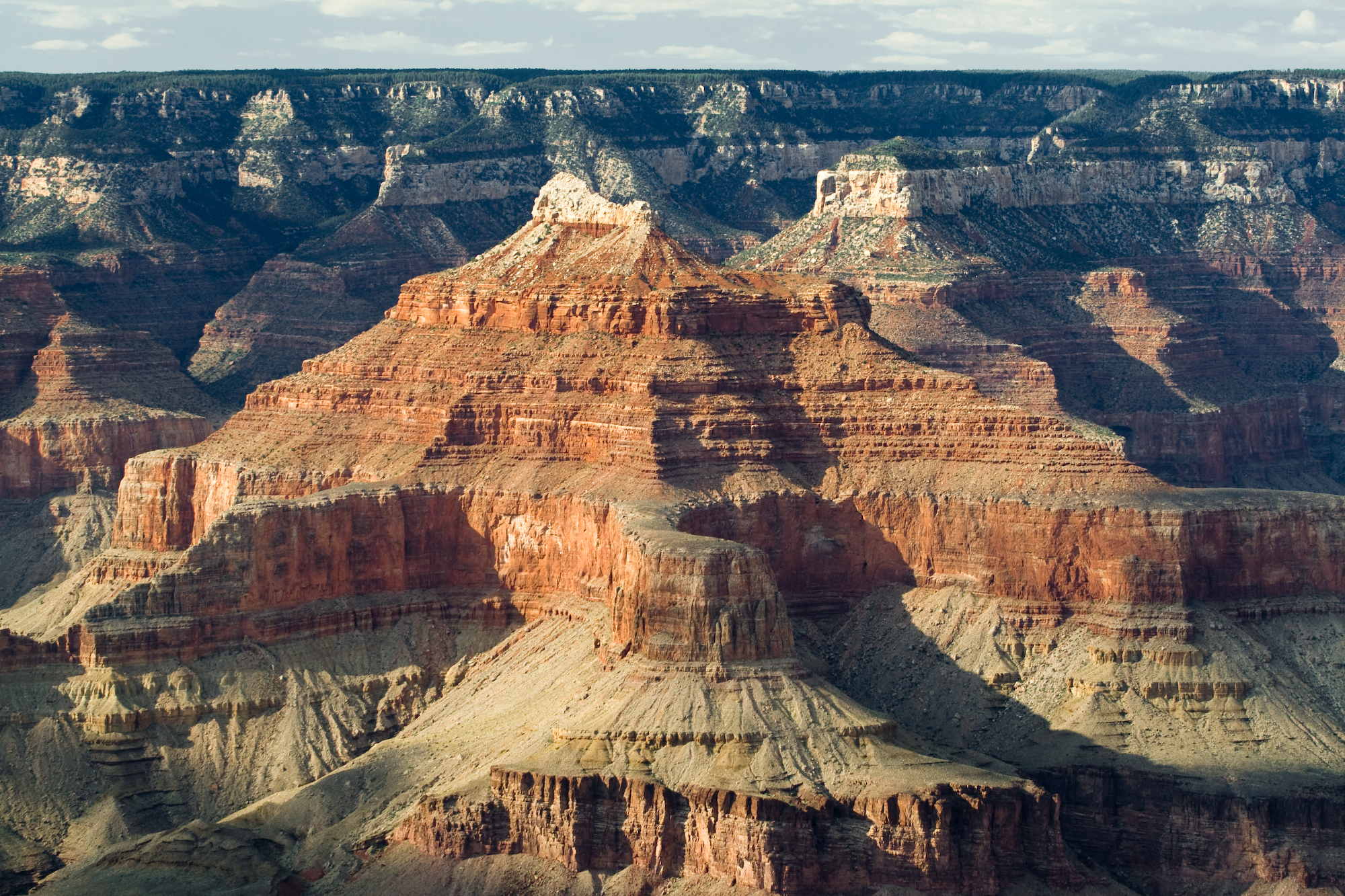
- south view of Isis Temple, Grand Canyon, from 2-mi, on Tonto Trail, Tonto Platform uppermost vertical red cliff of Esplanade Sandstone (the lower large red vertical cliff is Redwall Limestone upon a lower shelf-cliff of grayish vertical Muav Limestone)
- Type: Geological formation
- Underlies: Hermit Formation – (Permian), Grand Canyon; (Hermit elsewhere in Arizona: (west) – Oak Creek Canyon region, Sedona, AZ (townsite))
- Overlies: Wescogame Formation, (3rd member) – Supai Group
- Thickness: 330 feet (100 m) approximate maximum

Lithology
- Primary: sandstone

Location
- Region: (southwest) Colorado Plateau; Northern Arizona, Grand Canyon, basement rocks of Verde Valley, Arizona, & extreme southwest Utah
- Extent: Grand Canyon

The Lower Permian Esplanade Sandstone is a cliff-forming, resistant sandstone, dark red, geologic unit found in the Grand Canyon. The rock unit forms a resistant shelf in the west Grand Canyon, south side of the Colorado River, at the east of the Toroweap Fault, down-dropped to west, southeast of Toroweap Overlook (North Rim, at Lava Falls), and west of Havasupai. The red, sandstone shelf, The Esplanade is about 20 miles (32 km) long. At Toroweap Overlook region, Toroweap Valley with Vulcan's Throne, Uinkaret volcanic field, the resistant Esplanade Sandstone is described in access routes exploring the Toroweap Lake area (Hike 17, Vulcans Throne).

The Esplanade Route–(trail), of the east Grand Canyon is also named for the Esplanade Sandstone. The coeval sandstone geologic unit from eastern Utah is the Cedar Mesa Sandstone.

== Isis Temple and Hermosa Group, Utah ==
In Grand Canyon, Isis Temple landform, north of Grand Canyon Village (South Rim, 5 miles (8.0 km)), contains a representative example of the Supai Group 'redbeds', and slope-former and cliff-former units that support the landform. The sequence of units below the white Coconino Sandstone prominence of Isis Temple are:

- G – Coconino Sandstone–white prominence ('white' – ridgeline to right is from North Rim, ~1.5 miles (2.4 km) distant)
- F – Hermit Formation – grayish slopes
- E – Supai Group – (massive sloped ‘’red-beds’’)
  - 4 – Esplanade Sandstone – cliff-former
  - 3 – Wescogame Formation
  - 2 – Manakacha Formation
  - 1 – Watahomigi Formation
- D – Redwall Limestone – large (vertical) red cliff
- C – Muav Limestone – grayish-cliff (attached at base of Redwall cliffs – 40%)
- B – (light-greenish slope-former) – Bright Angel Shale
- A – upon (dk brown massive cliffs) – Shinumo Quartzite

The Esplanade Sandstone is only found in Arizona, with the Hermosa Group being the equivalent coeval 'redbed' type geologic sequence found north and northeasterly in Utah – (parts of western border Colorado).

== Geologic sequence ==
The Late Pennsylvanian–Early Permian geologic sequence of the Supai Group common in the Grand Canyon: The Pennsylvanian is the Late Carboniferous.

- Supai Group
  - Esplanade Sandstone
  - Wescogame Formation
  - Manakacha Formation
  - Watahomigi Formation

The Supai Group members were created from marine (oceanic) sequences of marine transgression, and regression, thus the alternating sandstone, siltstones, conglomerate subsections (facies); the subsections are not always a continuous transition into the above section, mostly due to ocean levels, falling, or rising, glaciation, or regional subsidence–(basins, etc.) or uplift of land. Today's Wasatch Front is the approximate lineage, NNE to SSW of the western coast region of North America from where the oceans transgressed. The ancient Antler Mountains–(Antler orogeny, off-shore volcanic island arch(es)), of ancient Nevada supplied material, from the west, off the 'ancestral' West Coast. The continent supplied material from the east, both directions supplying the offshore basin, the Cordilleran Basin which became part of the Basin and Range Province, in later epochs. Three other basins were involved in this history: southwest of the Ancestral Rocky Mountains was the Paradox Basin–(eastern Utah to Southwest Colorado), northeast was the Central Colorado Basin–(NW Colorado, NE Utah, SW Wyoming); the Oquirrh Basin was north-northwest, at present day northwest Utah.

=== Supai Group and Hermosa Group, coeval units ===
The approximate coeval Supai and Hermosa Groups, Arizona, Utah, and northwest Colorado:

| Arizona – Grand Canyon & central-northeast AZ | Utah – east & southeast | Uncom- compahgre Uplift | (northeast) – UT (northwest) – CO (proto) – Uintah Basin region |
|---|---|---|---|
| Supai Group; ~340–(330) to 285 Ma | Hermosa Group | "Ancestral Rocky Mtns" (eroded to sea level, 165 Ma) | Hermosa Group |
| 4 – Esplanade Sandstone – (Grand Canyon & Verde Valley region) | Cedar Mesa Sandstone | "Ancestral Rocky Mtns" | xxxxxxx |
| 3B – Pakoon Limestone – (west) – Grand Canyon, & NV | Elephant Canyon Formation – (east & southeast) Utah | "Ancestral Rocky Mtns" | Hermosa members? |
| 3 – Wescogame Formation | (Hermosa) | "Ancestral Rocky Mtns" | Hermosa members? |
| 2 – Manakacha Formation | (Hermosa) | "Ancestral Rocky Mtns" | Hermosa members? |
| 1 – Watahomigi Formation | (Hermosa) | "Ancestral Rocky Mtns" | Hermosa members? |
| | | Uncom – compahgre Uplift |

Because marine transgressions cover distances, over time, the coeval units are separated by distance, and type of deposition material; the local subsidence, or uplift, as well as glaciation, and sea level changes, can cause variations in the deposition sequences of transgression–regressions. The ocean was to the west of the proto-North American continent, but also northwest, or southwest.

== See also ==
- Geology of the Grand Canyon area
- Cedar Mesa Sandstone
- Stratigraphy
- Marine transgression
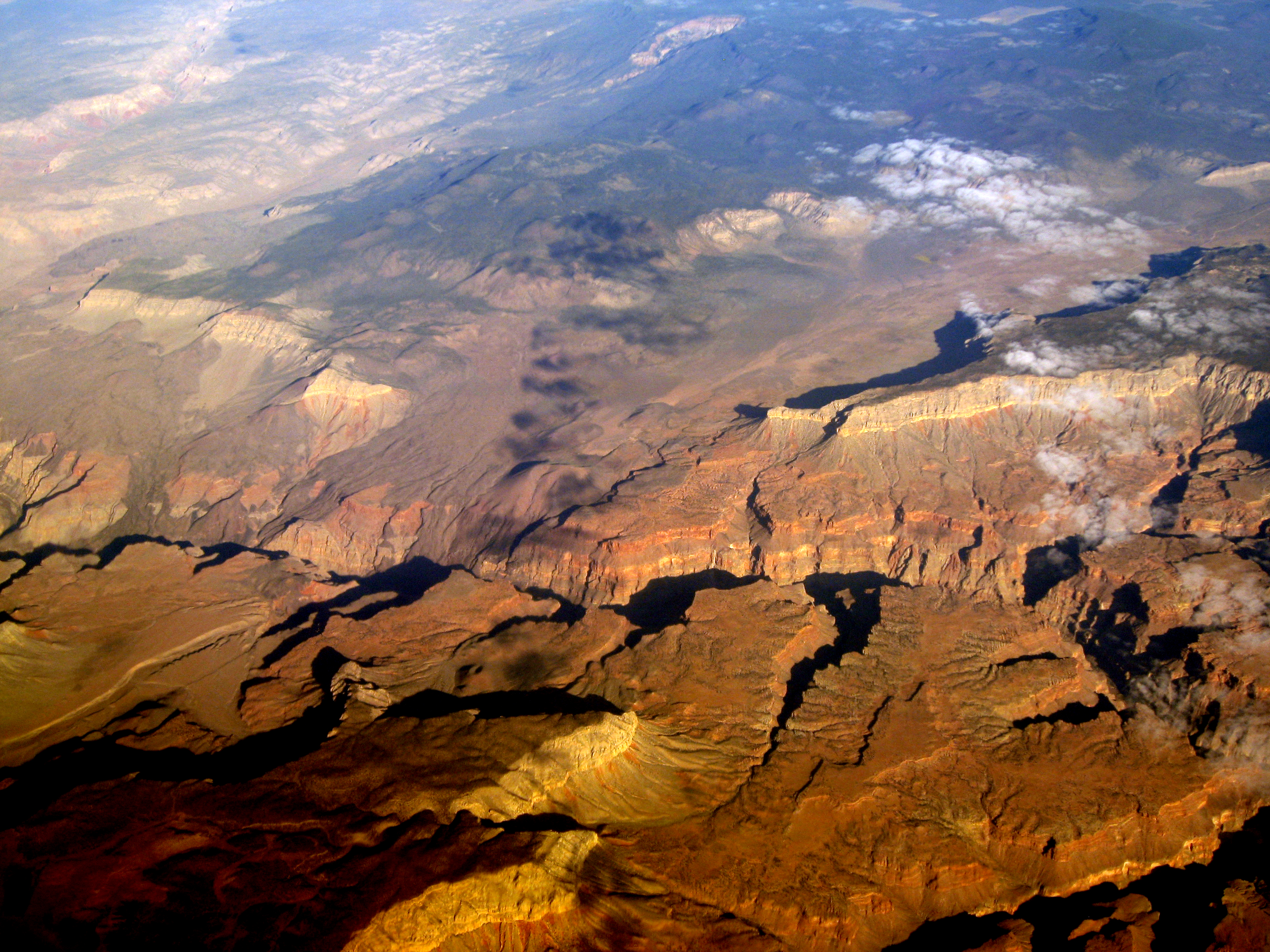
Aerial view – WNW of The Esplanade (Grand Canyon), south bank of Colorado River, with Toroweap Fault–(Prospect Canyon) as west border
Uinkaret volcanic field at NW; Lava Falls below in Colorado River
