= Kate Hill =

Kate Hill may refer to:

- Kate Hill (New York), mountain in New York, United States
- Kate Hill (nurse) (1859–1933), Australian nurse

== See also ==
- Katie Hill (disambiguation)
