= Catherine Hill (disambiguation) =

Catherine Hill (1893–1983) was a New Zealand maid.

Catherine Hill may also refer to:

- Catherine Hill, the street in Frome, England
- Catherine Hill (schooner)

== See also ==
- Katherine Hill (born 1987), American politician
- Katie Hill (disambiguation)
