= Ginseng Mountain =

Mountain in New York, United States

- Location within New York Location within the United States

Highest point
- Elevation: 2,805 feet (855 m)
- Coordinates: 42°20′29″N 74°11′45″W

Geography
- Location: Windham, New York, U.S.
- Topo map: USGS Hensonville

Ginseng Mountain is a mountain located in the Catskill Mountains of New York northeast of Windham.

== Geography ==
Elm Ridge is located south, Mount Zoar is located east-southeast, and Mount Hayden is located northwest of Ginseng Mountain.
