= Katie Hill (disambiguation) =

Katie Hill (born 1987) is an American politician from California.

Katie Hill may also refer to:

- Katie Hill (actress) (born 2003), English actress and singer
- Katie Hill (basketball) (born 1984), Australian 3.0 point wheelchair basketball player
- Katie Rain Hill (born 1994), American transgender activist and author

== See also ==
- Katy Hill (born 1971), English television presenter
- Kate Hill (disambiguation)
- Catherine Hill (disambiguation)
