= Mount Nebo (New York) =

Mountain in New York, United States

- Location within New York Location within the United States

Highest point
- Elevation: 2,680 feet (820 m)
- Coordinates: 42°21′57″N 74°13′19″W

Geography
- Location: Windham, New York, U.S.
- Topo map: USGS Hensonville

Mount Nebo is a mountain located in the Catskill Mountains of New York northeast of Windham. Mount Hayden is located southeast, and Mount Pisgah is located northwest of Mount Nebo.
