= Supai Group =

Geologic formation in the Grand Canyon

- Stratigraphic range: late Bashkirian–Sakmarian 320–290 Ma
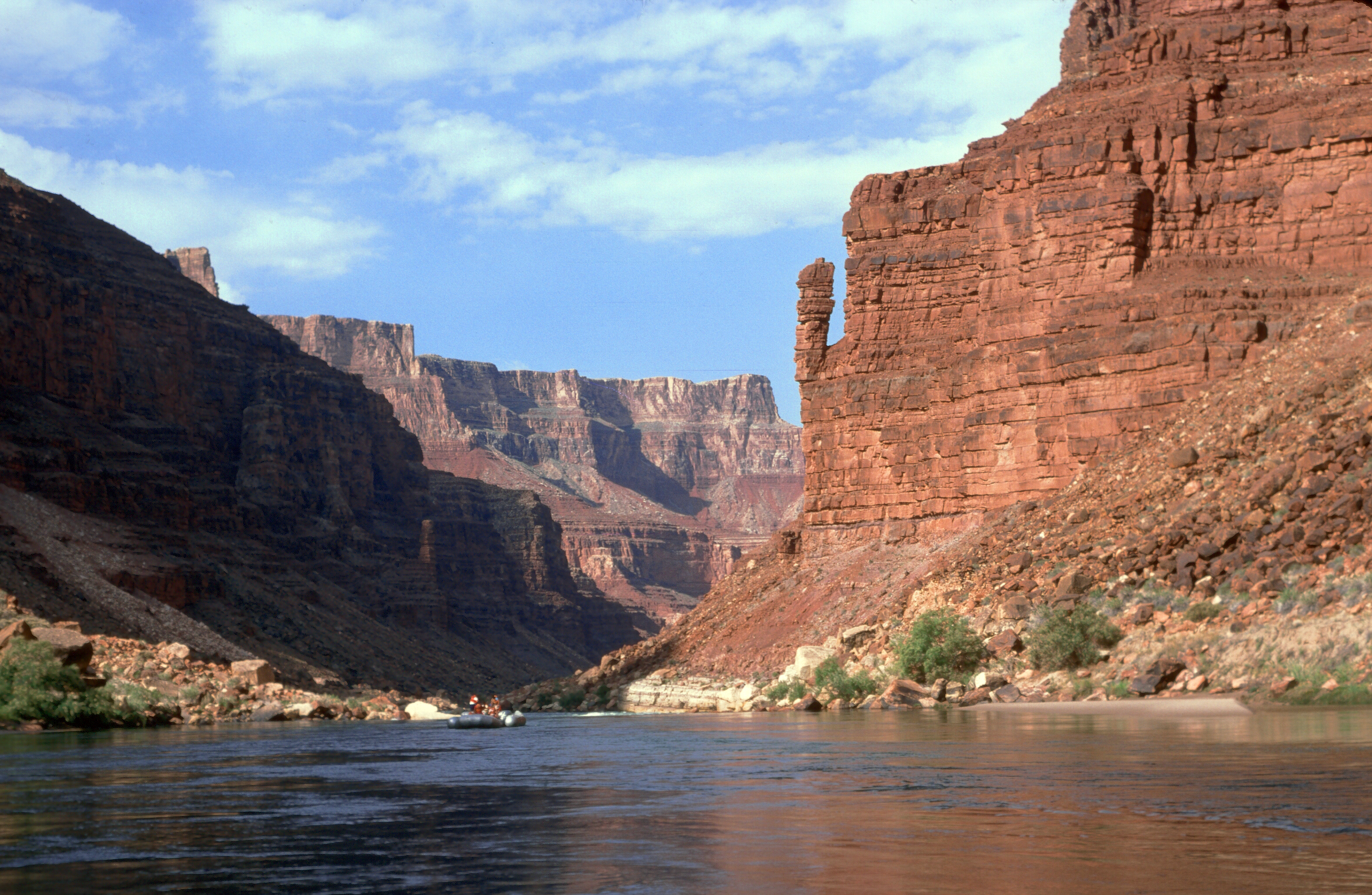
- Paleozoic Supai Group, underlying Surprise Canyon Formation, and top of Redwall Limestone in the eastern Grand Canyon at Twentythree Mile rapid.
- Type: Geological formation
- Sub-units: youngest to oldest: Esplanade Sandstone, Wescogame Formation, Manakacha Formation, and Watahomigi Formation
- Underlies: Hermit Formation and Schnebly Hill Formation
- Overlies: either Redwall Limestone, Surprise Canyon Formation, or Naco Formation
- Thickness: 1,400 feet (430 m), at maximum

Lithology
- Primary: sandstone and mudstone
- Other: siltstone, limestone, and conglomerate

Location
- Region: North and central Arizona, southeast California, southern Utah
- Country: United States
- Extent: Virgin River valley, Grand Canyon, Sycamore Canyon, and Verde Valley

Type section
- Named for: Supai, Arizona
- Named by: Dalton 1910
- Year defined: 1910
- Supai Group (the United States) Supai Group (Arizona)

The Supai Group is a slope-forming sequence of mixed red beds and limestones that outcrop in the Colorado Plateau. The group was laid down during the Pennsylvanian to Lower Permian. Cliff-forming interbeds of sandstone are noticeable throughout the group. The Supai Group is quite well exposed throughout the Grand Canyon in northwest Arizona, as well as local regions of southwest Utah, such as the Virgin River valley region. Known as the Supai Formation, it occurs in Arizona at Chino Point, Sycamore Canyon, and famously at Sedona as parts of Oak Creek Canyon. In the Sedona region, it is overlain by the Hermit Formation, and the colorful Schnebly Hill Formation. The Supai Group has been traced westward into the Great Basin in Nevada and California. and recognized in Paleozoic metamorphic strata exposed in the Big Maria Mountains, northeastern Riverside County, southeastern California.

== Nomenclature ==
The Supai Group was originally designated as the Supai Formation by Darton in 1910 for exposures at Supai, Arizona. Darton assigned the lower beds of G.K. Gilbert's (since abandoned) Aubrey Group to the Supai Formation, at the same time assigning the overlying gray sandstone beds to the Coconino Sandstone. In 1922, Noble separated the uppermost fine-grained, slope-forming strata of the original Supai Formation into the Hermit Shale, based on the disconformity between the two. Noble also established the lower boundary of the Supai Group based on a noticeable disconformity separating Mississippian strata from Pennsylvanian strata. He transferred 200 to 500 ft (61 to 152 m) of alternating red beds and compact limestones from the Redwall Limestone to the Supai Formation partly on the basis that the red beds resembled more closely the strata of the Supai Formation instead of the massive limestone beds of the Redwall Formation. Later, McKee raised its stratigraphic rank in 1975 from Supai Formation to Supai Group. McKee also divided the Supai Group into four formations; the Watahomigi Formation, Manakacha Formation, Wescogame Formation and Esplanade Sandstone, in the Grand Canyon region. The Supai Group remains at formation rank at other locations where its subunits are difficult to distinguish.

== Description ==
The Supai Group consists of alternatingly interbedded soft, reddish shales and sandy; hard, buff or pinkish buff sandstones; and, in its lower part, hard, gray limestones. Most the sandstone consist of thick, massive beds that erode as prominent, vertical cliffs. The limestones also erode to form prominent, vertical cliffs. The beds of shale and laminated sandstone weather as slopes. The alternation of hard and soft beds form a distinct step-like profile, which consists of alternating cliffs and slopes. The Supai Group overlies either the Redwall Limestone or Surprise Canyon Formation and underlies the Hermit Formation.

This topographic profile of the Supai Group is consistent enough that it was initially divided into five subdivisions based upon the cliff versus its slope-forming character and, thus, indirectly on associated lithology within the Grand Canyon region. They are the (1.) Upper cliff unit, locally includes a receding ledge unit (Esplanade cliff); (2.) Upper slope unit; (3.) Middle cliff unit; (4.) Middle slope unit; (5.) Lower cliff and slope unit. These units can be traced throughout the Grand Canyon as they differ remarkably little from one end to the other. However, westward, the slope units do become less conspicuous. In particular, the middle slope unit becomes so weakly developed in the western Grand Cayon region, that the lower and middle cliff units seem to merge such that lower and middle cliff units appear to merge.

In 1975, McKee incorporated specific key beds, fauna zones, and erosion surfaces into the above topographic units to define the Watahomigi Formation, Manakacha Formation, Wescogame Formation and Esplanade Sandstone. Most important to defining and mapping these formations are three key beds, in addition to the basal conglomerate underlying the Redwall Limestone and Surprise Canyon Formation, consisting of widespread, lithologically distinct, conglomerates. Two of these of conglomerates are associated with marked erosional surfaces and, thus, likely represent regional unconformities. Marine fossils that occur above and below. these conglomerates also indicate that they represent significant periods of nondeposition and erosion.

== Watahomigi Formation ==
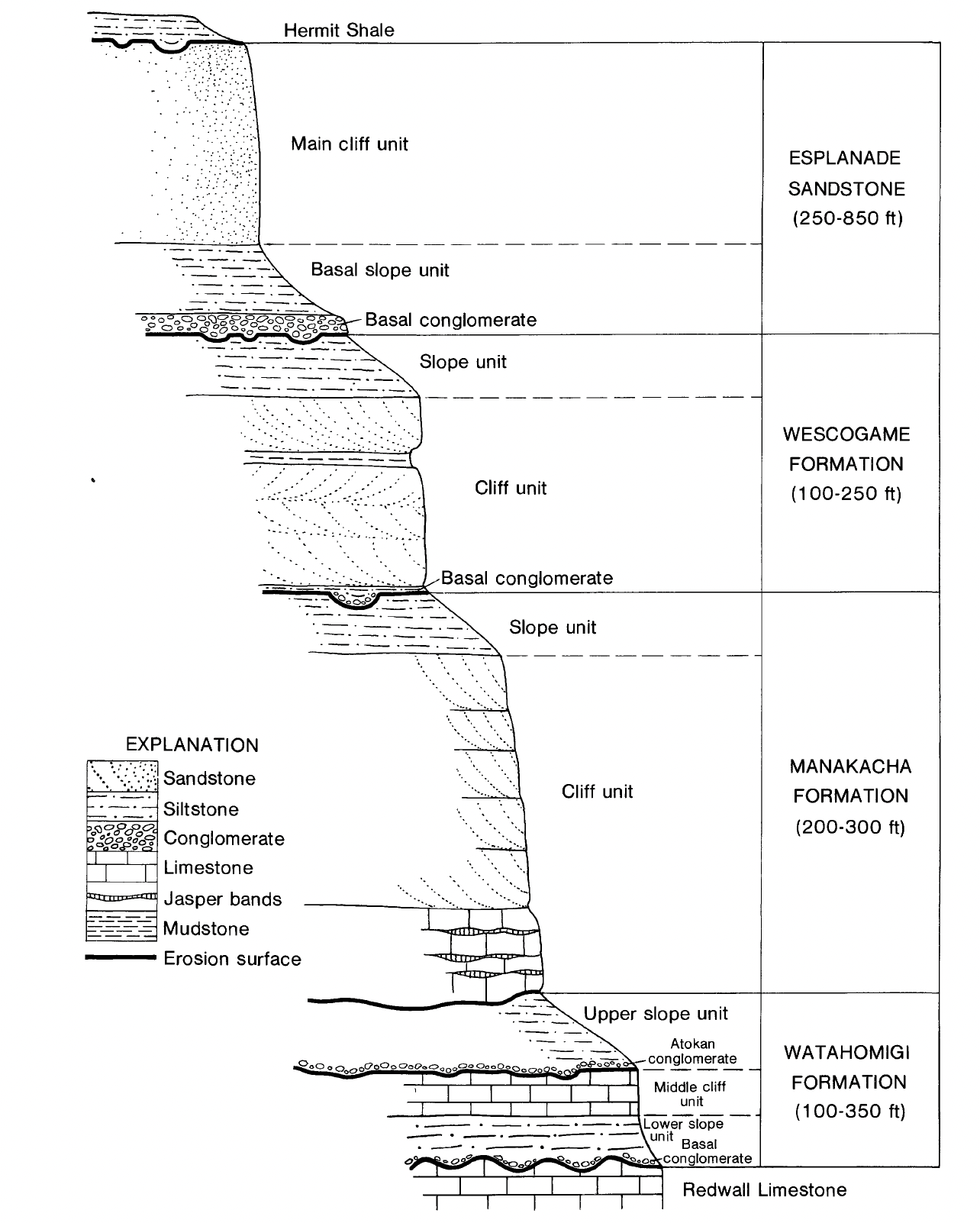
Generalized stratigraphic profile of Supai Group in Grand Canyon region, USA.

The Watahomigi Formation, which is named for Watahomigi Point on the west side of Havasu Canyon, consists chiefly of red mudstone and siltstone, gray limestone and dolomite, and two conglomerate beds. Typically, one conglomerate bed occurs at or near its base. The other, the Atokan conglomerate, occurs locally about two-thirds up its thickness. The basal conglomerate is interbedded with purple siltstone and gray limestone and fills small erosion channels cut into either the Surprise Canyon Formation or Redwall Limestone. The upper and lower thirds of it consist of slope-forming redbeds, The middle third of the formation is composed mostly of limestone beds containing red chert lenses and nodules. These limestone beds form a massive cliff. The Watahomigi Formation conformably underlies the Manakacha Formation. The Watahomigi Formation is a broad, slightly westward-thickening sheet. It ranges from 300 ft (91 m) thick in eastern Grand Canyon to 100 ft (30 m) thick in western Grand Canyon and along the Grand Wash Cliffs.

== Manakacha Formation ==
The Manakacha Formation is named from Manakacha Point on the east side of Havasu Canyon and directly above Supai village. It consists of quartz sandstone, calcareous sandstone, dark-red siltstone, and gray limestone. The sandstone exhibits sets of trough, planar, and compound cross-bedding that ranges from 1 ft (30 cm) to 30 ft (9.1 m) in thickness. The Manakacha Formation rests conformably on the Watahomigi Formation. Its upper contact is an unconformity consisting of an erosional surface. The basal conglomerate of the Wescogame Formation overlies this erosional surface. The Manakacha Formation is broad, sheetlike deposit across northwestern and central Arizona that averages about 300 ft (91 m) thick in Grand Canyon and 150 feet (45 m) thick across the Verde and Chino valleys.

== Wescogame Formation ==
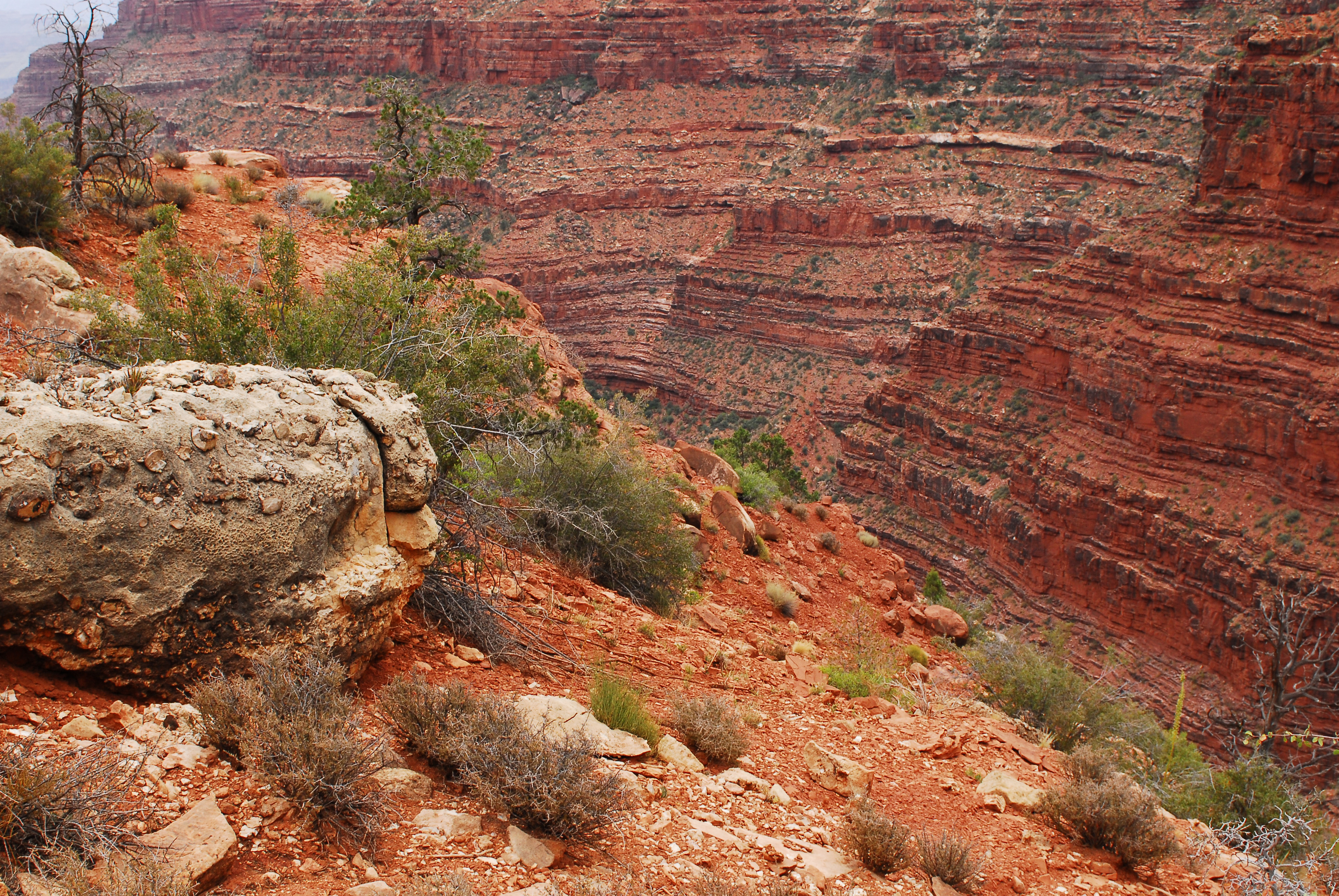
Red beds of Supai Group

The Wescogame Formation is named from Wescogame Point on the west side of Havasu Canyon and directly above Hualapai Canyon. Its lower part consists of cliff-forming, light-red to gray, high-angle, large- and medium-scale, tabular-planar, cross-bedded sandstone and calcareous sandstone as much as 40 ft (12 m)thick Its upper part consists mainly of slope-forming, dark-red, fine-grained siltstone and mudstone interbedded with light-red, coarse-grained, calcareous sandstone and dolomitic sandstone, siltstone, mudstone, and a basal conglomerate. the basal conglomerate unconformably overlies the Manakacha Formation. The unconformable contact with underlying Manakacha Formation consists of paleovalleys as much as 80 ft (24 m)deep in the western Grand Canyon area and less than 30 ft (9.1 m) deep in the eastern Grand Canyon area. Conglomerates composed of either limestone, chert, or both commonly fill the paleovalleys. The Wescogame Formation lies unconformably beneath the Esplanade Sandstone. The Wescogame Formation consists of a sheet that ranges from 200 to 300 ft (61 to 91 m) thick across the Grand Canyon and the western Mogollon Rim region.

== Esplanade Sandstone ==
The Esplanade Sandstone is named for the Esplanade platform that is a prominent bench in the walls of the Grand Canyon. It consists mainly of beds generally 5 to 50 ft (1.5 to 15.2 m) thick beds of cross-stratified sandstone. The sandstone beds are typically separated by either thin, red mudstone; fine-grained limestones or dolomite; or prominent, irregular-bedding planes. Most cross-bedded sandstone exhibit climbing translatent strata. In western Grand Canyon, the Esplanade Sandstone contains some extensive beds of gypsum. As previously noted, it unconformably overlies the Wescogame Formation. The Hermit Formation unconformably overlies the Esplanade Sandstone and is and separated from it in many places by an erosional surface exhibiting numerous paleovalleys. The Esplanade Sandstone is a steadily northwestward-thickening wedge. This wedge ranges from over 800 ft (240 m) in the western Grand Canyon and along the Grand Wash Cliffs to 200 to 250 ft (61 to 76 m) thick in the eastern Grand Canyon and western Mogollon Rim region. In the western Grand Canyon region grades into the Pakoon Limestone, which is included in its thickness.

== Contacts ==
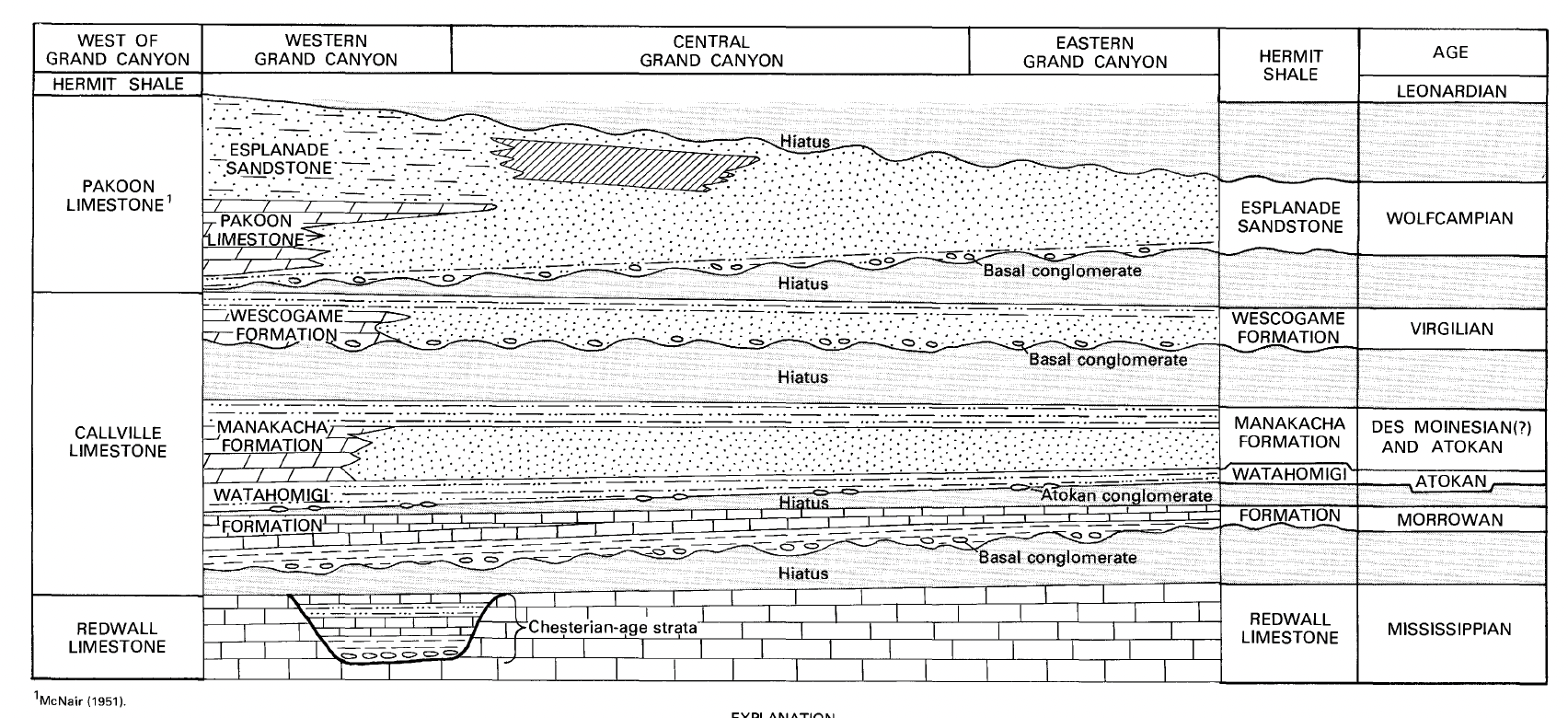
Generalized east-west stratigraphic cross-section of Supai Group in Grand Canyon region. Chesterian-age strata now known as the Surprise Canyon Formation.

The contact between the base of the Supai Group and the underlying Redwall Limestone and Surprise Canyon Formation is a regional unconformity. It consists of an eroded surface, which covered by either a thin widespread, but locally discontinuous, limestone and chert pebble conglomerate or purplish red calcareous siltstones and mudstones.

The top of the Redwall Limestone represents a period of subaerial erosion during the Late Mississippian period during which rivers entrenched deep paleovalleys, as much as 400 ft (120 m) deep, into the Redwall Limestone. Also, during this period an extensive karst plain formed on the surface of the Redwall Limestone. Later with rising sea levels, the strata of the Surprise Canyon Formation accumulated within the paleovalleys before it and extensive karst plain were buried by the accumulation of the Watahomigi Formation.

In parts of central and eastern Grand Canyon region, the upper contact of the Supai Group consists of paleovalleys of considerable depth cut into the Esplanade Sandstone. These paleovalleys are filled by deposits of the Hermit Formation. However, in the western Grand Canyon and other parts of western and northern Arizona, little evidence of an erosional break can be found between the Hermit Formation and the Esplanade Sandstone. In these areas, a recognizable interruption in the accumulation of sediment between the Esplanade Sandstone is lacking and the Hermit Formation is only separated by an arbitrary boundary from the Esplanade Sandstone.

== Fossils ==
The lower three formations of the Supai Group, the Watahomigi Formation, Manakacha Formation, and Wescogame Formations, represent different stages of multiple transgressive-regressive cycles. During these cycles, the depositional setting fluctuated between fluvial, eolian, tidal, and shallow marine environments associated with a broad coastal plain. The cyclic deposition of these sediments began with latest Mississippian and continued through the Pennsylvanian. The limestone beds associated with marine transgressive phase of these depositional cycles are locally fossiliferous and yield the remains of invertebrate body fossils.

The limestones of the Watahomigi Formation have yielded the most abundant and diverse assemblage of marine invertebrate fossils. It has yielded 66 genera of about 80 genera of typically nearshore, shallow marine invertebrate fossils recovered and identified from the Supai Group. These fossils consist predominately of spiriferid and productid brachiopods and a lessor diversity of pelecypods (mainly myalinid bivalves). Less abundant taxa include bellerophontid and euomphalinid gastropods, proetid trilobites, encrusting bryozoans, undetermined and favositid corals, conulariids, echinoid spines, and disarticulated crinoid plate and columnals. The abundance of brachiopods and pelecypods along with the rarity of corals reflect a shallow marine, nearshore environment that was either too energetic or too turbid for extensive coral growth. Fragmentary fish fossils known from the Watahomigi Formation include xenacanth shark teeth and actinopterygian fish jaws.

The limestones of the Manakacha and Wescogame formations contain sparse faunas. Invertebrate fossils consist of only a few foraminifera, gastropods, unspecified marine fossils, and bioclasts of unspecific bryozoans, brachiopods, bivalves, bellerophontid gastropods, ostracods, pelmatozoan (stalked) echinoderms, and foraminifera. The Manakacha Formation has yielded the most diverse assemblage of reported foraminifera taxa. Westward of the Grand Canyon region, the Manakacha and Wescogame formations have yielded larger, but still not notably more diverse, invertebrate faunas where the marine influence was more pronounced. The invertebrate fossils are indicative of a shallow marine, nearshore environment. Vertebrate fossils are rare in the Manakacha and Wescogame formations. Tooth plates of Deltodus sp. have been reported from Wescogame Formations Grand Canyon and the adjacent Lake Mead National Recreation Area In addition, a tetrapod trackway has been reported from the terrestrial, red beds of the Manakacha Formation from along the Bright Angel Trail and a few tetrapod track occurrences have been reported from the terrestrial, red beds of the Wescogame Formation.

The lower Permian Esplanade Sandstone is a sparsely fossiliferous eolian sandstone. The only invertebrates fossil reported from it occur as microscopic, fossil fragments, known as bioclasts. The fossil reported as bioclasts include foraminifera, unspecified invertebrate fossils, and bioclasts of bryozoans, bivalves or brachiopods, and echinoderms observed in petrographic thin-sections. They are possibly either reworked materials from other units such as the Pakoon Limestone or samples collected from interbeds of Pakoon Limestone within the Esplanade Sandstone. The Pakoon Limestone, a fossiliferous marine limestone, which interfingers with the lower Esplanade Sandstone, has yielded corals, gastropod, brachiopods, fusulinids, and bryozoans.

== Transgressive-regressive cycles ==
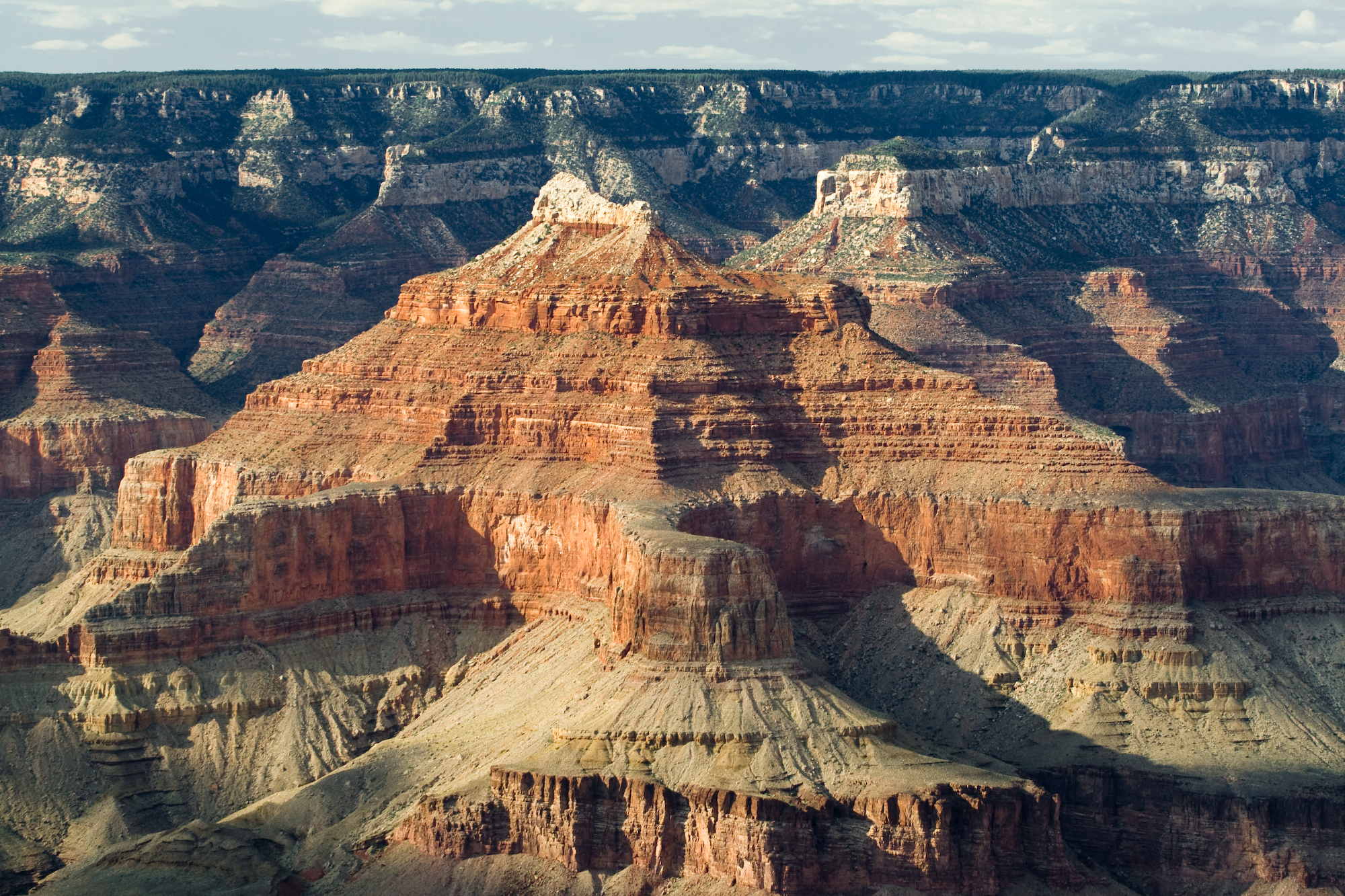
Entire Supai Group, Isis Temple, Grand Canyon

The deposits of the Supai Group accumulated during multiple transgressive-regressive cycles associated with major sea level fluctuations reflecting changes in the volume of continental ice sheets resulting from glacial - interglacial cycles. As a result of significant changes in eustatic sea level locally modulated by local subsidence or uplift. As sea level fluctulated, fluvial, eolian, tidal, and shallow marine environments associated with a broad coastal plain shifted back and forth across the Grand Canyon area resulting in the cyclic deposition red beds, eolian sandstones, and marine limestones. Limestone beds represent the shallow marine limestone deposited during highstands of sea levels during maximum transgression. Unconformities characterized by paleovalleys and erosion surfaces covered with conglomerates represent lowstands of sea level during which river eroded deeply into coastal plains. The cyclic deposition of these sediments began with latest Mississippian and continued through the Pennsylvanian.

== See also ==
- Escalante Butte
- Geology of the Grand Canyon area
- Marine transgression
- Stratigraphy
- The Howlands Butte
- Whites Butte
