= Mount Pisgah (Greene County, New York) =

Mountain in Greene County, New York

- Location within New York Location within the United States

Highest point
- Elevation: 2,910 feet (890 m)
- Coordinates: 42°22′38″N 74°14′47″W, 42°22′27″N 74°14′47″W

Geography
- Location: Windham, New York, U.S.
- Topo map(s): USGS Durham, Hensonville

Mount Pisgah is a mountain located in the Catskill Mountains of New York north of Windham. Steenburg Mountain is located northwest, Richtmyer Peak is located west, and Mount Nebo is located southeast of Mount Pisgah.
