= Kate Hill (New York) =

Mountain in New York, United States

- Location within New York Location within the United States

Highest point
- Elevation: 2,382 feet (726 m)
- Coordinates: 42°19′55″N 74°09′16″W

Geography
- Location: SE of East Windham, New York, U.S.
- Topo map: USGS Hensonville

Kate Hill is a mountain in Greene County, New York. It is located in the Catskill Mountains southeast of East Windham. Mount Zoar is located west, and Windham High Peak is located south-southeast of Kate Hill.
