= Hermit Formation =

Geologic formation in the Grand Canyon

- Stratigraphic range: late Artinskian–early Kungurian 275–270 Ma
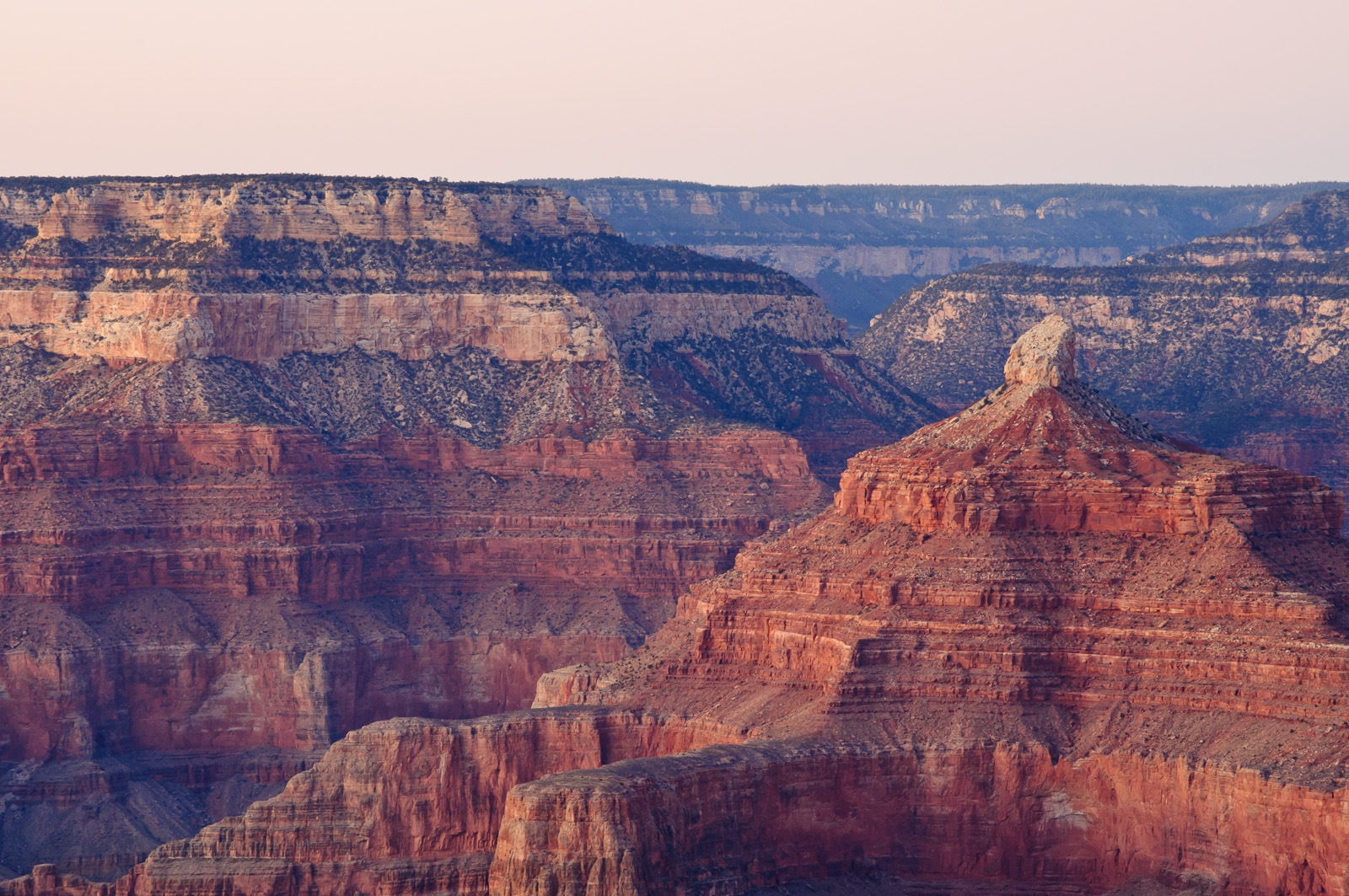
- (Isis Temple, central Grand Canyon); The 3 top geologic units visible: 3)-(white-cliffs-prominence)-Coconino Sandstone, 2)-(slope-forming-Deep brnsh-red)-Hermit Formation, 1)-(red-uppermost-vertical-cliff & resistant)-Esplanade Sandstone (top unit of 4–member Supai Group) (Note: Distinctive Redwall Limestone upper horizontal-platform.)
- Type: Geological formation
- Underlies: Coconino Sandstone
- Overlies: Supai Group
- Thickness: 900 feet (270 m), at maximum

Lithology
- Primary: sandstone and mudstone
- Other: siltstone and intraformational conglomerate

Location
- Region: Arizona, California and Utah
- Country: United States

Type section
- Named for: Hermit basin, Coconino County, Arizona
- Named by: Noble (1922)

The Permian Hermit Formation, also known as the Hermit Shale, is a nonresistant unit that is composed of slope-forming reddish brown siltstone, mudstone, and very fine-grained sandstone. Within the Grand Canyon region, the upper part of the Hermit Formation contains red and white, massive, calcareous sandstone and siltstone beds that exhibit low-angle cross-bedding. Beds of dark red crumbly siltstone fill shallow paleochannels that are quite common in this formation. The siltstone beds often contain poorly preserved plant fossils. It outcrops across northwestern Arizona from the Sedona area, and it outcrops in the Grand Canyon and the western Mogollon Rim, into the Aubrey Cliffs. It forms steep slopes that are typically mostly covered by debris and colluvium derived from the overlying sedimentary strata.

== Nomenclature ==
As summarized by McKee in 1982, the sedimentary strata assigned to the Supai Group and Hermit Formation have a long and complicated nomenclature. However, out of numerous publications, three major papers have been responsible for the defining the Hermit Formation as currently mapped in the Grand Canyon region First in 1910, Darton proposed the name of Supai Formation for Pennsylvanian-Permian redbeds exposured at its type section in the vicinity of Supai Village in Cataract Canyon, central Grand Canyon. As defined by Darton, the Supai formation included all Pennsylvanian-Permian strata, mostly red beds, lying between the Redwall Limestone and the Coconino Sandstone in the Grand Canyon region. In 1922, Noble recognized and separated the strata now comprising the Hermit Shale from the top of Darton's Supai. In 1975, McKee changed the Supai Formation to Supai Group and subdivided it into four formations within the Supai Group: the Watahomigi, Manakacha, and Wescogame formations and the Esplanade Sandstone. Given it heterogenous nature and abundance of sandstone and siltstone within it, the Hermit Shale was renamed the Hermit Formation. Subsequence publications of the last 35 years have used the largely used the term Hermit Formation.

== Lithology ==
The Hermit Formation consists of a poorly exposed, slope-forming, heterogeneous assemblage of interbedded red-to-brown mudstone, siltstone, and very fine sandstone. Northward along the Hurricane Cliffs and into adjacent Utah, the sandstone content increases as it laterally interfingers and merges with the Queantoweap Sandstone. The Hermit Formation varies in thickness from about 30 m (98 ft) in the eastern portion of the Grand Canyon and near Seligman to over 270 m (890 ft) in the areas of Toroweap overlook and Shivwits Plateau. The Hermit Formation can be traced in the western Mogollon Rim region east of Seligman to the Sedona region, where it is about 90 m (300 ft) thick.

Silty sandstone and sandy mudstone comprise most of the lithology of the Hermit Formation. At most outcrops, sandstone predominates near the base of this formation and decreases as mudstone increases in abundance upward. The sandstone and mudstone beds are typically rhythmically interbedded with 15 or more cycles exposed in most locations. The silty sandstones are structureless to ripple laminated to trough cross-stratified. The structureless sandstone layers consist of ledge-forming beds that are around 1 m (3.3 ft) in thickness and may or may not contain limy, nodular concretions. The ripple-laminated sandstone beds exhibit subaqueous, faint-to-prominent ripple cross-lamination. The troughs exhibited by the trough cross-stratified sandstone up to several meters across. Near the base of the Hermit Formation at many localities within Grand Canyon and in the Sedona, Arizona areas, rare trough to planar-tabular sets of cross-stratified sandstone, fine-grained and well-sorted, with climbing translatent strata, occur. Because of poor exposures, both the extent and geometry of individual sandstone beds are uncertain. Commonly, the mudstone is featureless. However, clean rock outcrops display fine ripple lamination and calcareous nodular concretions.

Although a minor component overall, thin intraformational conglomerates are locally present within the Hermit Formation. The pebbles are typically locally derived from the adjacent carbonate concretions found within the intercalated sandstone and mudstone. A few of these pebbles also consist of carbonate-cemented, fine-grained sandstone and siltstone. These conglomerates occur both as individual beds and incorporate into sandstone beds. They are common abundant in the area of Sedona, Arizona. They decrease in abundance all directions from there.

== Contacts ==
In parts of central and eastern Grand Canyon region, the lower contact of the Hermit Formation consists of paleovalleys of considerable depth cut into the Esplanade Sandstone. These paleovalleys are filled by deposits of the Hermit Formation. However, in the western Grand Canyon and other parts of western and northern Arizona, little evidence of an erosional break can be found between the Hermit Formation and the Esplanade Sandstone. In these areas, a recognizable interruption in the accumulation of sediment between the Esplanade Sandstone is lacking and the Hermit Formation is only separated by an arbitrary boundary from the Esplanade Sandstone.

Throughout Grand Canyon and into the Aubrey Cliffs regions, the upper contact of the Hermit Formation with the overlying Coconino Sandstone is a sharp, flat, lithologic disconformity. This disconformity lacks aggradation of any kind. Desiccation cracks that extend 6 m (20 ft) deep or more from the top of the Hermit. They frequently are filled with the overlying sandstone. These cracks are not seen where the Coconino is absent in northwestern Arizona. In northwestern Arizona where the Coconino is absent, the contact between the Hermit Formation and the overlying Toroweap Formation is a sharp erosional unconformity with relief up to 11 m (36 ft) or more.

== Fossils and Age ==
The fossils of invertebrates are typically uncommon and poorly preserved in the Hermit Formation. This is due to the unfavorable conditions of fossil preservation associated with the arid fluvial environments and grain size of the Hermit Formation. Two fossil insect wings have been described from the Hermit Formation of the Grand Canyon region. Both are meganeurids, members of an extinct clade resembling modern dragonflies, and date the Hermit Formation to the early Permian Period. Other reported invertebrate fossils include a partial wing of an odonate and a forewing of an unnamed blattoid or cockroach. Also, a poorly preserved external mold of a eurypterid, Hastimima spp., has been collected from the Hermit Formation. Finally, The Hermit Formation contains the unstudied trackways, burrows, and resting and feeding traces of invertebrates along with the more common root bioturbation and microbial structures.

The Hermit Formation has yielded a well-preserved and diverse assemblage of vertebrate trace fossils, including tracks and trackways, known from the Grand Canyon region. It contains the ichnotaxa Amphisauropus kablikae, Amphisauropus, Batrachichnus salamandroides, Dimetropus isp., Dromopus lacertoides, Erpetopus isp., Hyloidichnus bifurcatus, and Ichniotherium cottae. The presence of Dimetropus and Ichniotherium suggests a late Artinskian to Kungurian age for the Hermit Formation because it is overlain by the late Kungurian Coconino Sandstone. This assemblage of vertebrate trace fossils is an abundant and relatively diverse collection of reptile and anamniote tracks and rarer synapsid tracks.

In 1929, David White published a monograph about the fossil flora is of the Hermit Formation. In it, he reported 29 species of fossil plants and identified an additional ten additional species only identified to genus level, or of uncertain identification. However, it is likely that there are only half that many actual species in the Hermit Formation because many fossils are poorly preserved and doubtfully described. The major plant groups reported from the Hermit Formation include seed plants, including seed ferns, conifers, horsetails, Ginkgoopsida, and algae.

== Depositional environments ==
Based on fossils and it sedimentology, the Hermit Formation is interpreted as being deposited by fluvial processes on a seasonally arid coastal plain. Locally, eolian processes deposited loess and created scattered sand dunes, which left local accumulations of eolian sand deposits.

== See also ==
- Geology of the Grand Canyon area
