= Manakacha Formation =

Geologic formation in Arizona

- Stratigraphic range: Upper Pennsylvanian
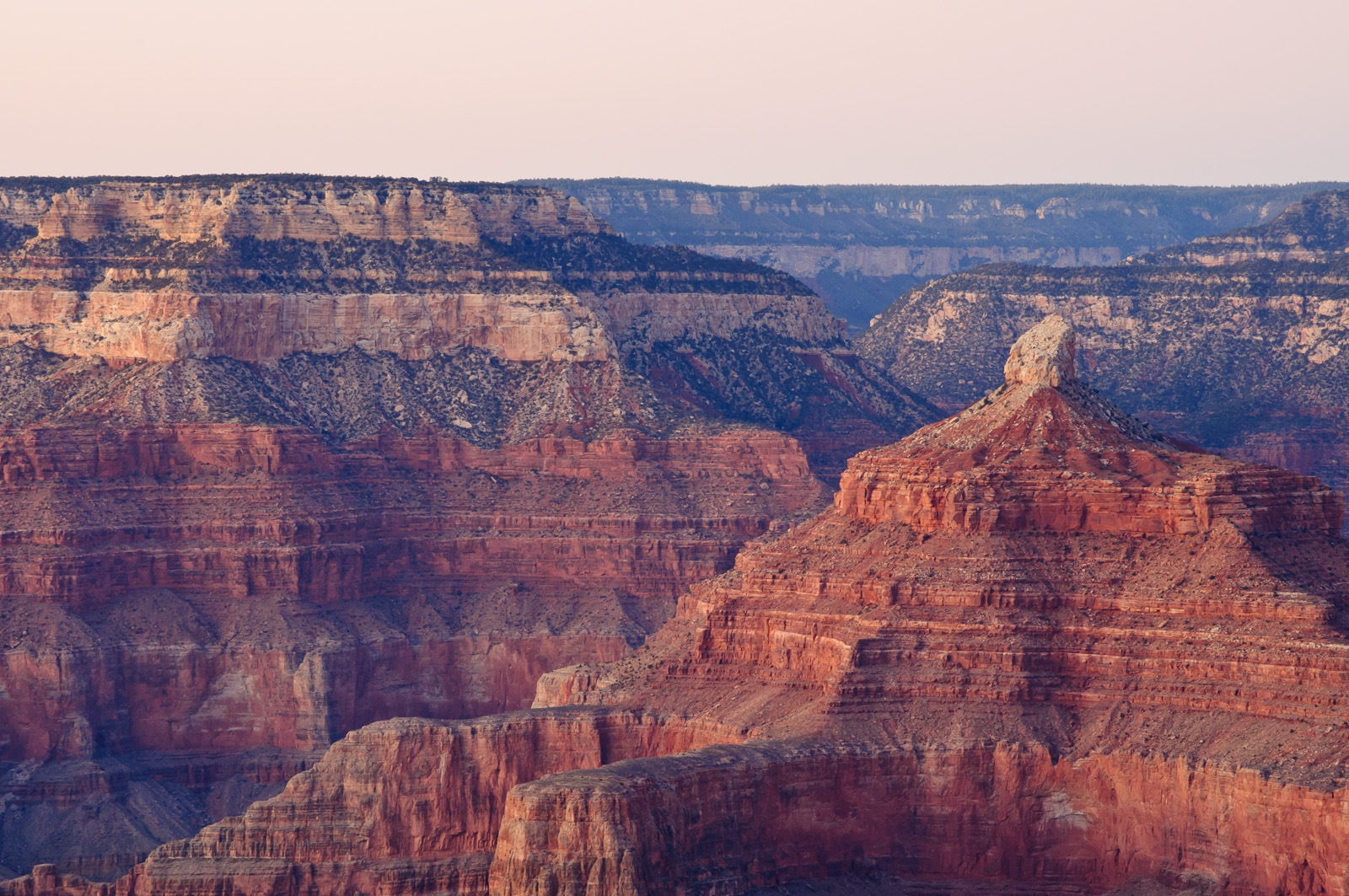
- The Manakacha Formation, sitting on a debris slope of Watahomigi Formation, on top of resistant Redwall Limestone, of the same red color
- Type: Geologic unit
- Unit of: Supai Group
- Underlies: Wescogame Formation
- Overlies: Watahomigi Formation
- Thickness: 200 feet (61 m) max (100–200 ft typical)

Lithology
- Primary: sandstone, siltstone

Location
- Coordinates: 34°00′N 97°00′W
- Region: Colorado Plateau, southwest and south
- Extent: Grand Canyon, Verde Valley, and basement rocks of Mogollon Rim and central & east-northeast Arizona

The (Upper) Late Pennsylvanian Manakacha Formation is a cliff-forming, sandstone, red-orange geologic unit, formed from an addition of eolian sand, added to marine transgression deposits, (siltstones, etc.), and found throughout sections of the Grand Canyon. It is one of the lower members of the Supai Group (member two of four major units), with the Supai Group found in other sections of Arizona, especially in the Verde Valley region, or as a basement unit below the Mogollon Rim, just eastwards or part of the basement Supai Group of the southwest & south Colorado Plateau.

The Manakacha Formation was laid down (especially in the Grand Canyon). It consists of up to 400 feet (120 m) of calcareous sandstone and shaly mudstone. It represents a time when deposition of aeolian sand became more widespread. The Manakacha was deposited at about the same time as the Weber Sandstone was deposited in northeast Utah in Dinosaur National Monument region, northeast of the Uncompahgre Uplift. This was likely during the Atokan and Desmoinesian Ages of the Pennsylvianian.

== Geologic sequence ==
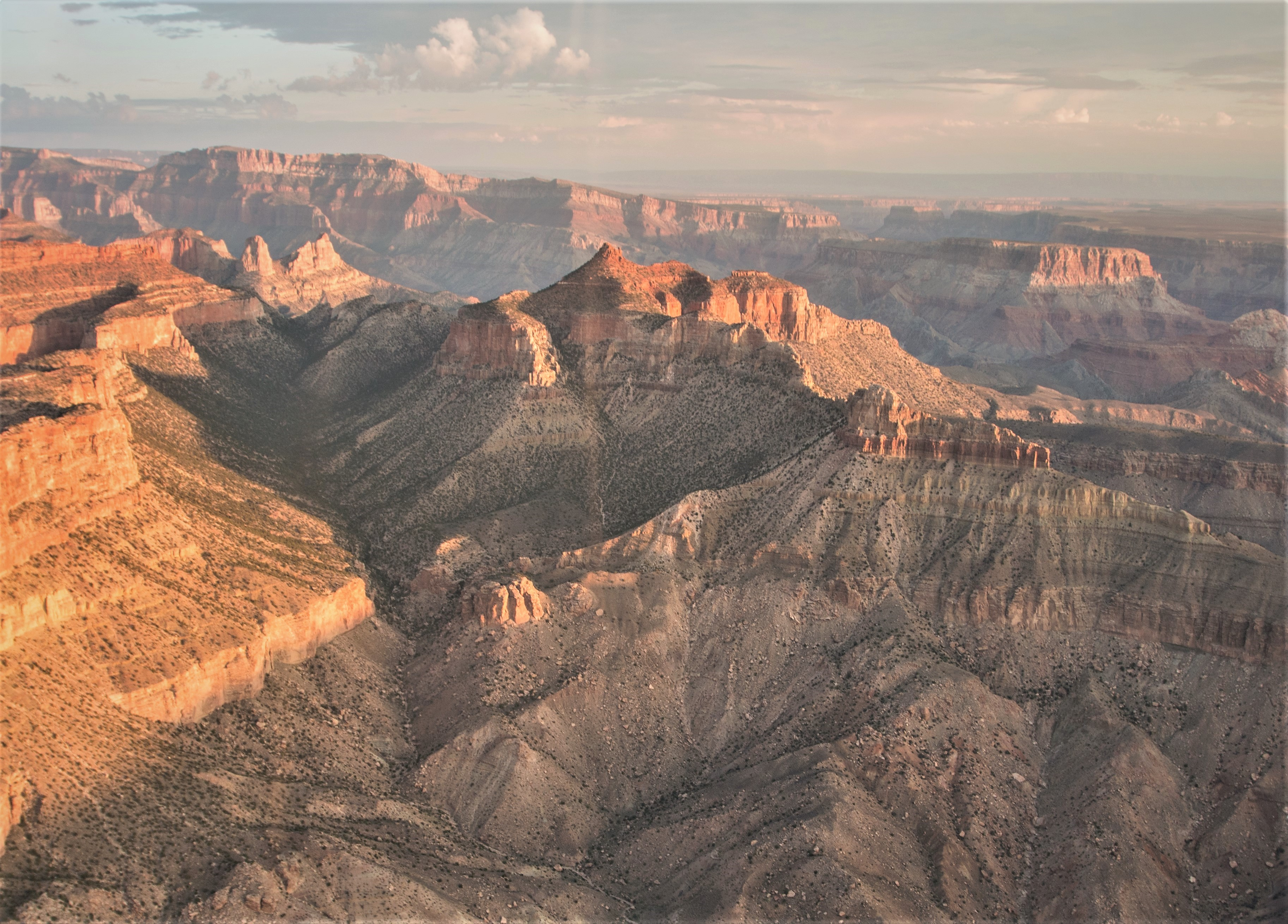
Gunther Castle, having a cliff of the Manakacha Formation

The geologic sequences of the coeval Supai and Hermosa Groups.

- Supai Group
  - 4 – Esplanade Sandstone
  - 3 – Wescogame Formation
  - 2 – Manakacha Formation
  - 1 – Watahomigi Formation
- Hermosa Group, named for Hermosa Cliffs, north of Durango, Colorado
  - 3 – Honaker Trail Formation
  - 2 – Paradox Formation
  - 1 – Pinkerton Trail Formation

The Supai Group members were created from marine sequences of marine transgression, and regression which produced alternating sandstone, siltstone, and conglomerate subsections. The subsections are sometimes separated by unconformities, due to changing ocean levels, glaciation, or regional subsidence. The ancient off-shore Antler Mountains supplied material from the west of the ancestral West Coast. The North American continent supplied material from the east. Three other basins were formed at the same time: the Paradox Basin of eastern Utah, the Central Colorado Basin in Colorado, and the Oquirrh Basin in northwest Utah.

Because marine transgressions cover distances, over time, the coeval units are separated by distance, and type of deposition material; the local subsidence, or uplift, as well as glaciation, and sea level changes, can cause variations in the deposition sequences of transgression-regressions. The ocean was to the west of the proto-North American continent, but also northwest, or southwest.
