= Surprise Canyon Formation =

Landform in the Grand Canyon, Arizona

- Stratigraphic range: Late Mississippian (Serpukhovian) 331–323 Ma
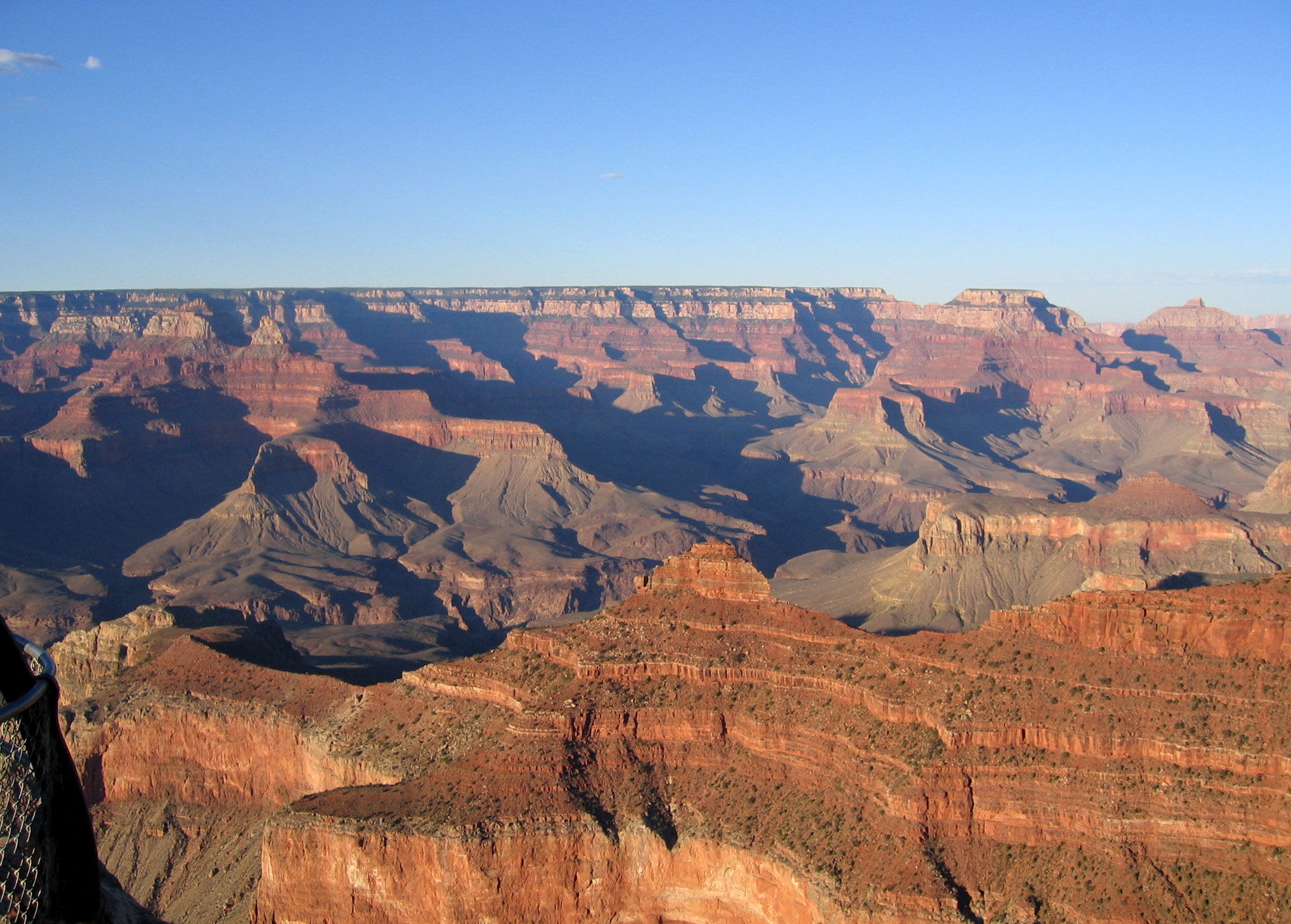
- Pattie Butte-(Newton Butte), The ridgeline, north sits on Redwall Limestone 'platform'–(2-places, photo-bottom-left, top of red Redwall cliff), and topped by 2nd-platform of Surprise Canyon Formation.
- Type: Formation
- Underlies: Watahomigi Formation, basal member of Supai Group
- Overlies: Redwall Limestone
- Thickness: 0–122 m (0–400 ft)

Lithology
- Primary: sandstone, conglomerate, limestone, siltstone

Location
- Region: southwest Colorado Plateau, Arizona-(northern)
- Country: United States-(Southwestern United States)
- Extent: Grand Canyon

Type section
- Named for: Surprise Canyon, Grand Canyon National Park
- Named by: George H. Billingsley and Stanley S. Beus

The Surprise Canyon Formation is a geologic formation that consists of clastic and calcareous sedimentary rocks that fill paleovalleys and paleokarst of Late Mississippian (Serpukhovian) age in Grand Canyon. These strata outcrop as isolated, lens-shaped exposures of rocks that fill erosional valleys and locally karsted topography and caves developed in the top of the Redwall Limestone. The Surprise Canyon Formation and associated unconformities represent a significant period of geologic time between the deposition of the Redwall Limestone and the overlying Supai Group.

== Nomenclature ==
In 1969, E. D. McKee and R. C. Gutschick reported the presence of conglomerate- and mudstone-filled paleovalleys cut into the upper surface of the Redwall Limestone. They provide examples and descriptions of these deposits and considered them to be the basal strata of the Supai Group.

George Billingsley of the United States Geological Survey first recognized the Surprise Canyon Formation as a separate stratigraphic unit, belonging to neither the Supai Group or the Redwall Limestone, during reconnaissance geological mapping of the western Grand Canyon in the mid-1970s. Exposures of the Surprise Canyon Formation appeared as unusual dark red-brown outcrop patterns during an inspection flight over the Grand Canyon and in aerial photographs used to map the geology of the canyon. The remoteness of these outcrops deterred on-site ground truthing of these observations for more than a year.

Later, in a monograph on the Supai Group, Billingsley and McKee described some of these outcrops in westernmost Grand Canyon in detail for the first time. They referred to the strata of the Surprise Canyon Formation informally as preSupai buried valley deposits and interpreted them the sedimentary fill of paleovalleys.

Billingsley and Beus formally named the Surprise Canyon Formation for a large, northern tributary canyon in western Grand Canyon. The type section for this formation is the east-facing slope of a narrow ridge about 2.4 km (1.5 mi) southeast of the Bat Tower viewpoint in western Grand Canyon at Mile 265 and about 20 km (12 mi) northwest of the mouth of Surprise Canyon at Mile 248. The paleovalley containing the type section is 305 m (1,001 ft) wide and 91 m (299 ft) deep.

== Distribution ==
Within the Grand Canyon regions, the Surprise Canyon Formation is exposed as isolated, lens-shaped patches throughout much of the Grand Canyon and in parts of Marble Canyon to the east. All of the known outcrops are discontinuous lenses up to several tens of meter thick and from a few tens of meters to nearly a kilometer wide. Nowhere does this formation occur as a single, continuous sheet, as do all of the other sedimentary rock units of Paleozoic age in the Grand Canyon. The Surprise Canyon Formation exposures are commonly found at the top of a major cliff formed by the resistant Redwall Limestone. At many locations, these exposures are situated along a narrow shelf some 460 m (1,510 ft) above the Colorado River and nearly 910 m (2,990 ft) feet below the rim. Although it has not been recognized in the subsurface, the Surprise Canyon Formation may occur as shoestring deposits beneath the Colorado Plateau adjacent to the Grand Canyon.

The majority of the sedimentary strata of the Surprise Canyon Formation fill paleovalleys that are 45 to 60 m (148 to 197 ft) deep and up to 1 km (0.62 mi) wide in western part of the Grand Canyon. Eastward, these paleovalleys become shallower and wider in central and eastern Grand Canyon. Thickness of the Surprise Canyon Formation at any one outcrop corresponds to the depth of the paleovalley in which it occurs. The thickest known section of Surprise Canyon Formation is exposed in Quartermaster Canyon in western Grand Canyon, where the formation is about 122 m (400 ft) thick. In the central Grand Canyon outcrops of the Surprise Canyon Formation are up to 45 m (148 ft) thick, whereas in eastern Grand Canyon and Marble Canyon region such outcrops are 18 to 20 m (59 to 66 ft) thick.

== Lithology ==
The strata, which fills the paleovalleys, karsted topography, and caves cut into in the upper surface of the Redwall Limestone, has the most varied lithology of any Paleozoic formation exposed in the Grand Canyon. Within western and central Grand canyon, the Surprise Canyon consists of three main layers. First, there is a basal, slope-forming, plant-bearing unit composed predominately of conglomerate and sandstone of fluvial origin. Second, overlying it is a middle limestone unit composed of fossiliferous, marine limestone beds that form a prominent cliff. Finally, there is an upper siltstone unit consisting of fossiliferous, slope-forming beds of silty or sandy limestone and siltstone of marine origin. Eastward within the eastern Grand Canyon, these three units merge laterally into a single layer of red-brown, slope-forming conglomeratic sandstone and siltstone that lacks limestone.

The basal conglomerate and sandstone unit consists largely of iron-stained pebble-to-cobble and locally boulder conglomerate. The coarse fraction of the conglomerate consists predominantly of chert and minor limestone gravel derived from the underlying Redwall Limestone. Some of this gravel contains typical Redwall Limestone fossils. In most sections, the conglomerate grades upward into beds of yellow to dark reddish brown or purple quartz sandstone or siltstone, or, in some sections, dark, organic-rich shale. The sandstone beds are commonly flat bedded, but some exhibit either trough cross-bedding or ripple lamination. In the southwest Grand canyon area, the dark, carbonaceous shales contain local coal beds 1 m (3.3 ft) thick. In the eastern Grand Canyon, the Surprise Canyon Formation consists entirely of red-brown to purple mudstone beds containing subordinate chert pebble conglomerate lenses.

Overlying the basal conglomerate and sandstone unit in the western and central Grand Canyon is a middle limestone unit predominately of coarse-grained, fossiliferous limestone that is typically composed of whole or fragmented shells. The middle limestone unit also contains beds of quartz sandstone up to 4 cm (1.6 in) thick that alternate with fossiliferous limestone beds up to 10 cm (3.9 in) thick. The base of this unit commonly truncates sandstone or siltstone beds of the underlying basal conglomerate and sandstone unit. The middle limestone unit typically forms resistant cliffs or ledges and weathers yellowish brown, rusty, or purple gray. The limestone and sandstone beds commonly exhibit small-scale trough cross-strata exhibiting bimodal current directions.

In western and central Grand Canyon, beds of a dark red-brown to purple, ripple-laminated to flat-bedded calcareous siltstone or sandstone of the upper siltstone unit typically overlie the middle limestone unit. These beds form weak slopes or receding ledges and commonly exhibit linguoid ripples. Beds of algal or ostracodal limestone that form resistant ledges commonly occur within this unit in western Grand Canyon. In at least three localities, nearly spherical algal stromatolites (oncolites) occur near the top of the unit.

== Contacts ==
The contact between the Surprise Canyon Formation and the overlying Watahomigi Formation of the Supai Group is a regional unconformity representing a period of erosion and lack of sediment accumulation during the Late Mississippian period. This contact is typically obscured either by limestone rubble from above or weathered colluvium. Where this contact is exposed, the eroded surface of the Surprise Canyon Formation is covered by (1) a thin widespread, but locally discontinuous, limestone pebble conglomerate that contains chert pebbles; or (2) purplish red calcareous siltstones and mudstones grading upward into resistant gray limestone beds containing pale red-to-orange chert nodules. In a few outcrops, the contact is a low-angle unconformity.

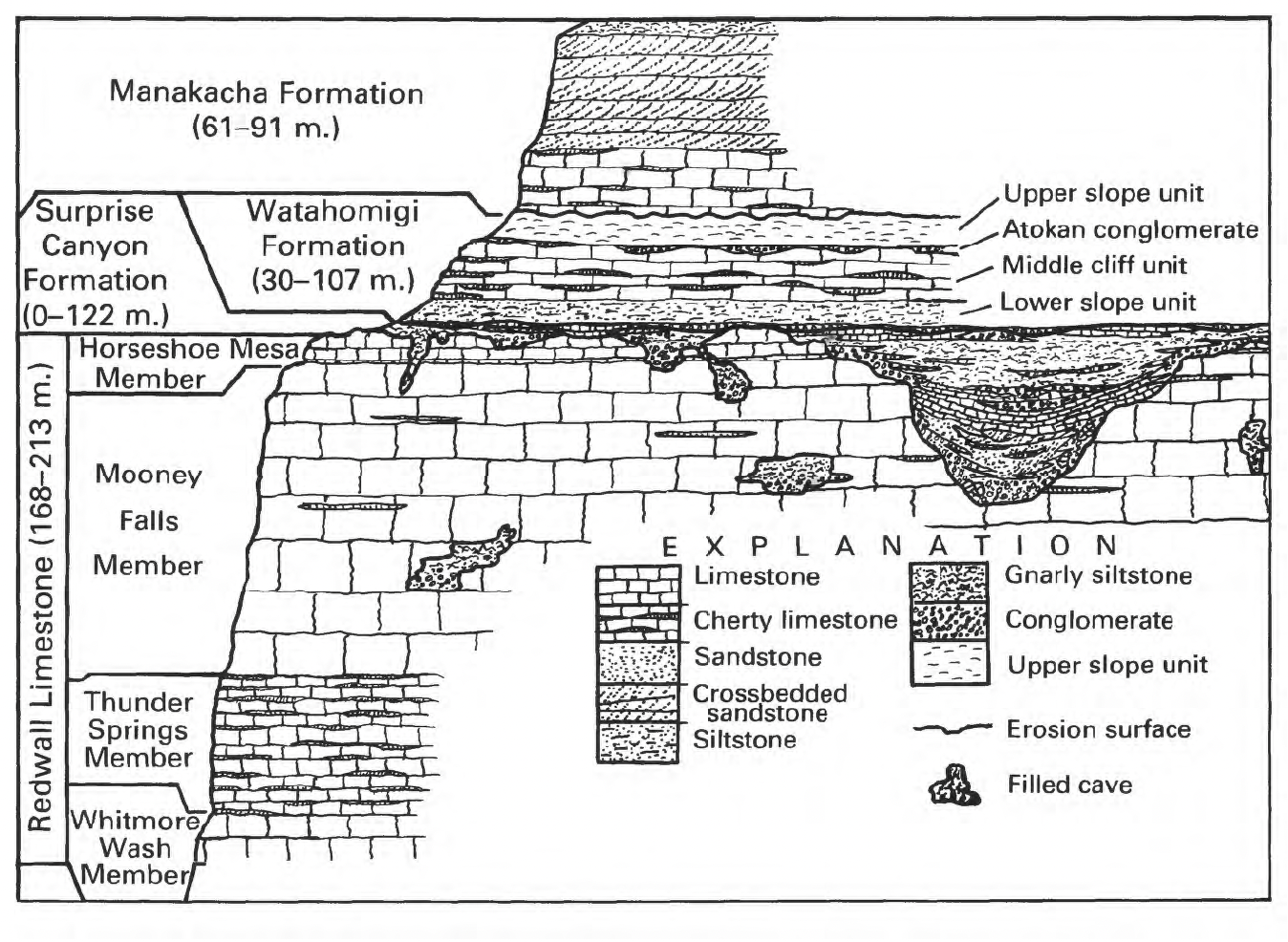
Schematic cross-section of the unconformity at the base of the Surprise Canyon Formation showing paleochannels and karstified paleosurface that form it and stratigraphic relationships of Redwall Limestone, it members, Surprise Canyon Formation, and Watahomigi Formation (Supai Group).

The basal contact of the Surprise Canyon formation consist either of gently U-shaped or V-shaped paleovalleys scoured or paleokarst and caverns corroded into the top of the Redwall Limestone. Along the axis of the major paleovalley, the basal layers of the valley-fill are everywhere deposited on the Mooney Falls Member of the Redwall Limestone as the paleovalleys have cut entirely through the Horseshoe Mesa Member and into the Mooney Falls Member. The upper strata of the Surprise Canyon Formation rest on the Horseshoe Mesa Member of the Redwall are more widely distributed. In outcrops, they extend as much as 0.5 km (0.31 mi) on either side of the main valley axis. In other outcrops, the lower contact consists of irregular, and smaller scale pits (ancient sinkholes) and former caverns filled with reddish-brown mudstone.

== Fossils ==
In terms of fossil content, the Surprise Canyon Formation is one of the richest and most diverse of any Paleozoic stratigraphic unit exposed in the Grand Canyon.

The basal conglomerate and sandstone unit of Surprise Canyon Formation has yielded a modest number of different fossil plants. These fossils have been found mainly in its sandstone, siltstone, or shale beds in the western Grand Canyon. They include 22 species of palynomorphs (spores), several types of algal structures, and 12 species of plant megafossils. The plant megafossils include three species of Lepidodendron, Calamites, and seed ferns. For example, between Burnt Springs Canyon (mile 259.5) in the western Grand Canyon and Cove Canyon in the central Grand Canyon, Lepidodendron log impressions have been found in the sandstone beds of this basal unit. In addition to the plant fossils, isolated dental and dermal elements of ancient sharks have been recovered from the basal conglomerate and sandstone unit. Finally, the sandstone beds of the basal unit also contain trace fossils in the form of simple, vertical burrows and rare Conostichus sp. These trace fossils have been assigned to the Skolithos ichnofacies.

The middle limestone unit of Surprise Canyon Formation contains an abundant and diverse fauna of marine invertebrate. Its coarse-grained limestones have yielded more than 60 species of marine invertebrates. They include foraminifers, conodonts, corals, bryozoans, brachiopods, echinoderms, mollusks, trilobites, and ostracodes. Brachiopods are the most abundant forms preserved and are commonly associated with bryozoans, corals, and echinoderms. Microfossils are moderately abundant in the middle limestone unit and some also occur in the limestone beds of the upper siltstone unit of the Surprise Canyon Formation. These microfossils include seven species of foraminifera. Ten species of conodonts have been found in both the middle limestone and upper siltstone units of the Surprise Canyon Formation. In addition, the middle limestone unit within the western Grand Canyon has yielded a remarkably diverse vertebrate fauna that consists of a total of thirty-one taxa identified from teeth and dermal elements. Finally, trace fossils typical of the shallow marine Cruziana ichnofacies have been reported from the limestone beds of the middle limestone unit.

== Age ==
The age of the Surprise Canyon is established as Serpukhovian (Late Mississippian). The initial determinations of age relationships of the underlying Redwall Limestone, Surprise Canyon Formation, and subdivisions of the overlying Supai Group were based upon calcareous foraminifera and corals. Later, studies of the brachipods of the Watahomigi Formation furthered narrow the possible age range of the Surprise Canyon Formation. Finally, conodont studies determined that the Surprise Canyon Formation is Serpukhovian (Late Mississippian) in age and that the Mississippian-Pennsylvanian boundary occurs in the lower part of the Watahomigi Formation, 17 m (56 ft) above the Surprise Canyon Formation-Watahomigi Formation contact. This conclusion is supported by current interpretations of fossil invertebrates, palynomorph, and foraminiferal data. Strata containing fossils of the biozone of the conodont Rhachistognathus muricatus have not been found in either the Surprise Canyon Formation or the overlying Watahomigi Formation. This indicates, the unconformity between the Surprise Canyon Formation and the overlying Watahomigi Formation appears to represent the time interval of this missing biozone and associated strata.

== Depositional environment ==
The Surprise Canyon Formation is interpreted as representing the accumulation of riverine and estuarine sediments in paleovalleys and of regolith in caverns and sinkholes eroded into the exposed surface of the Redwall Limestone during the Late Mississippian. As relative sea level dropped the westward retreat of the sea, a marine regression, subaerially exposed the seafloor in which the Redwall Limestone had accumulated. This left the former seafloor and upper surface of the Redwall Limestone subaerially exposed as a tropical sinkhole plain drained by west-trending, low-gradient rivers. The channels of these rivers and their tributaries eroded major drainage valleys that cut into the sinkhole plain as deep as 122 m (400 ft), 2/3 of the thickness of the Redwall Limestone. The corresponding drop in water table allowed the depth of karstification to exceed that of nearby paleovalleys. The basal conglomerate and sandstone unit in the western and central Grand Canyon is interpreted to represent sediments deposited by these rivers during this time. When relative sea level rose again and transgressed eastwards, the paleovalleys were gradually flooded as rivers and their floodplains were submerged to created estuaries. In these estuaries, estuarine and marine deposits accumulated to form the marine middle limestone and upper siltstone units. Relative sea level rose high enough to drown and deposit calcareous sediments of the Surprise Canyon Formation within the paleovalleys and mudstones within the paleokarst within the Grand Canyon region. However, relative sea level rise stopped before the Redwall Limestone surface outside of and above the paleovalleys was covered. The unconformity between the Surprise Canyon Formation and the overlying Watahomigi Formation suggests the occurrence of a period of regional relative sea level drop and associated erosion and nondeposition before the deposition of the Watahomigi Formation.

== Gallery ==
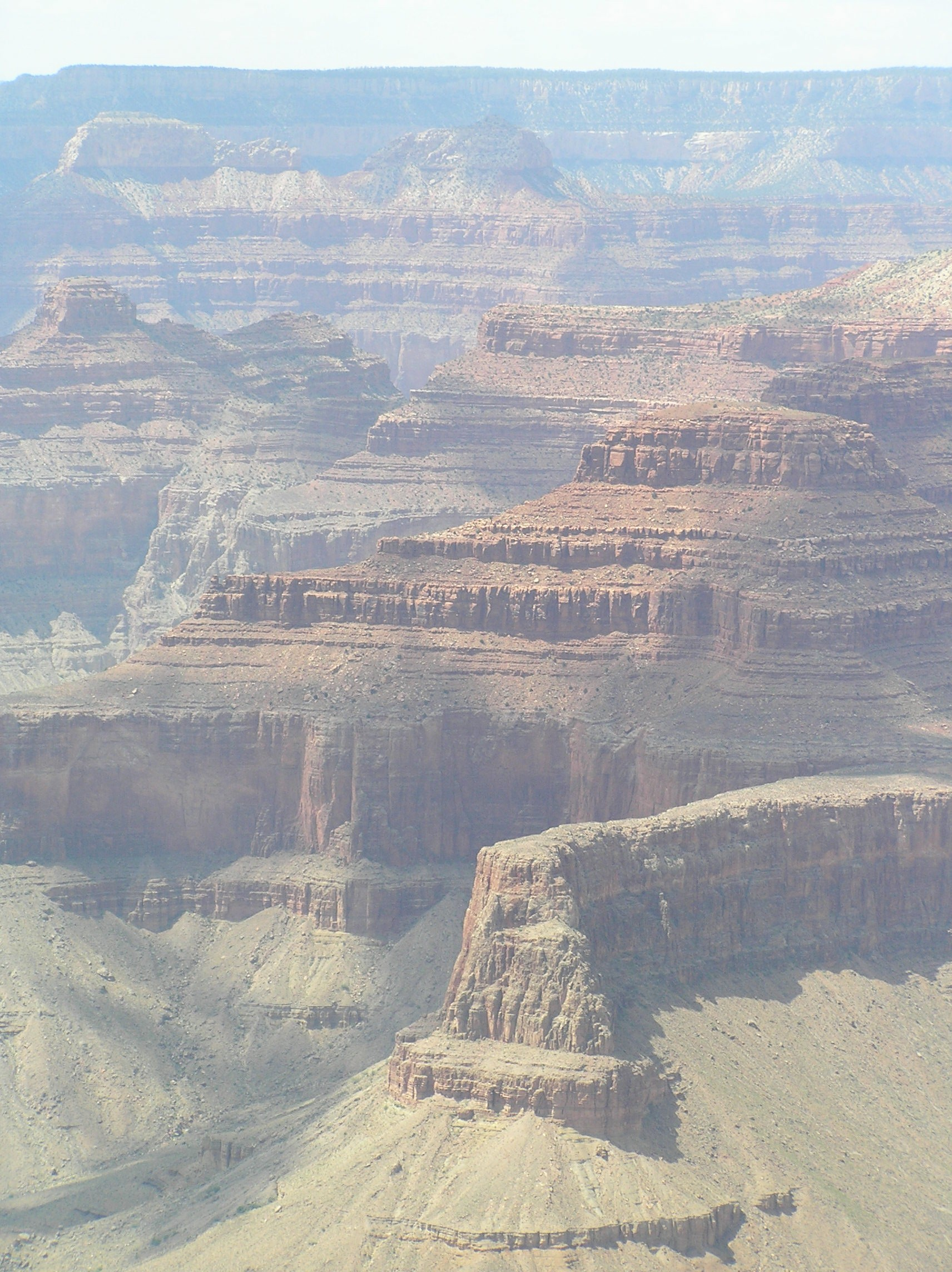
Dramatic Redwall Limestone cliffs, on ridgeline (cliffline) south, and part of the Tower of Set, East Granite Gorge (Inner Gorge, Grand Canyon)

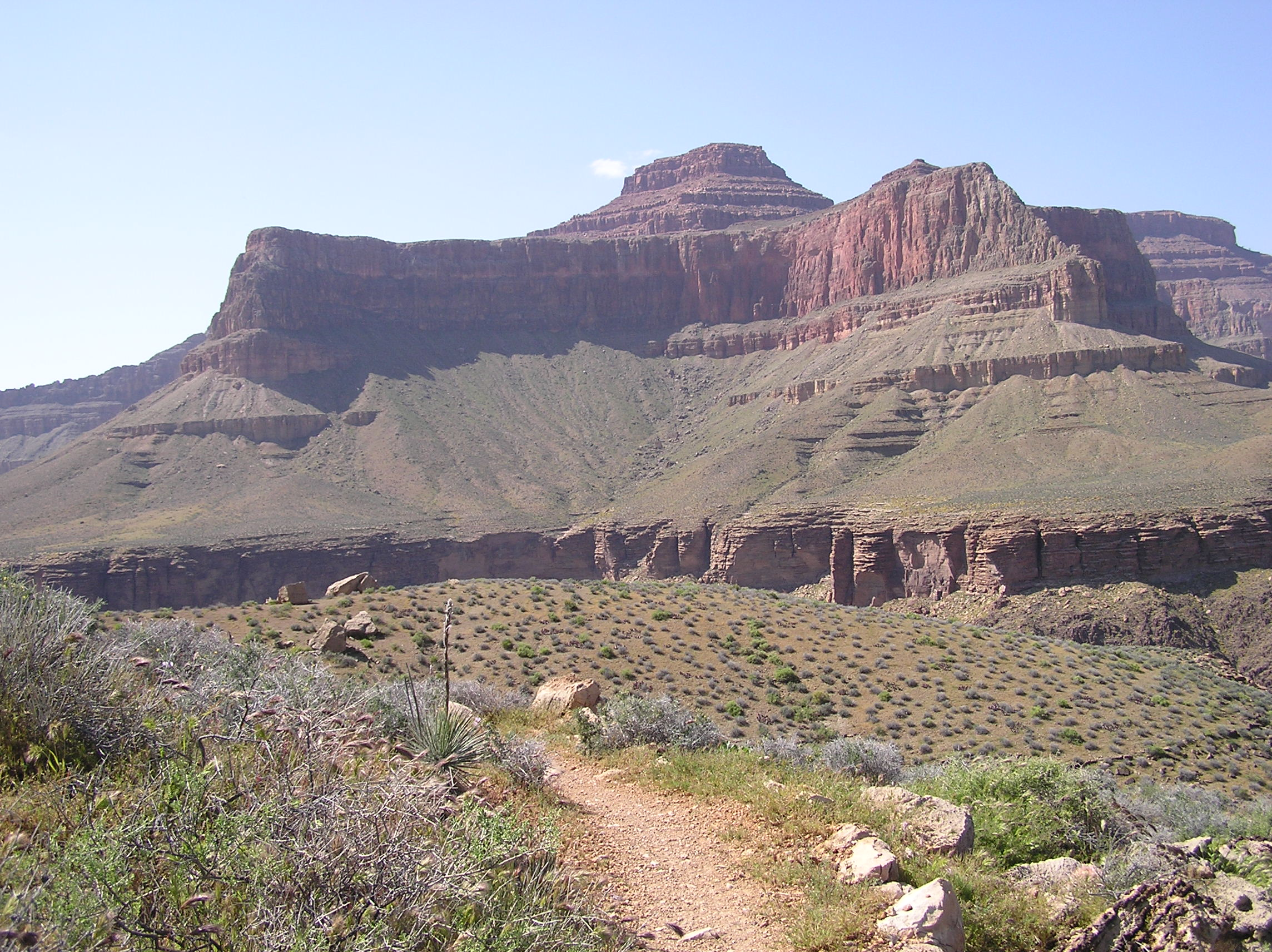
The Tower of Set on Inner Gorge-(east Granite Gorge).(View, from across Granite Gorge (south side, short Tapeats Sandstone cliffs visible at top of Gorge), from the Tonto Trail.)

== See also ==
- Geology of the Grand Canyon area
