= Mount Hayden =

Landform in the Catskill Mountains, New York

- Location within New York Location within the United States

Highest point
- Elevation: 2,930 feet (890 m)
- Coordinates: 42°21′31″N 74°13′09″W

Geography
- Location: Windham, New York, U.S.
- Topo map: USGS Hensonville

Mount Hayden is a mountain located in the Catskill Mountains of New York northeast of Windham. Mount Nebo is located north-northwest, and Ginseng Mountain is located southeast of Mount Hayden.
