= Watahomigi Formation =

Landform in the Grand Canyon, Arizona

- Stratigraphic range: Carboniferous
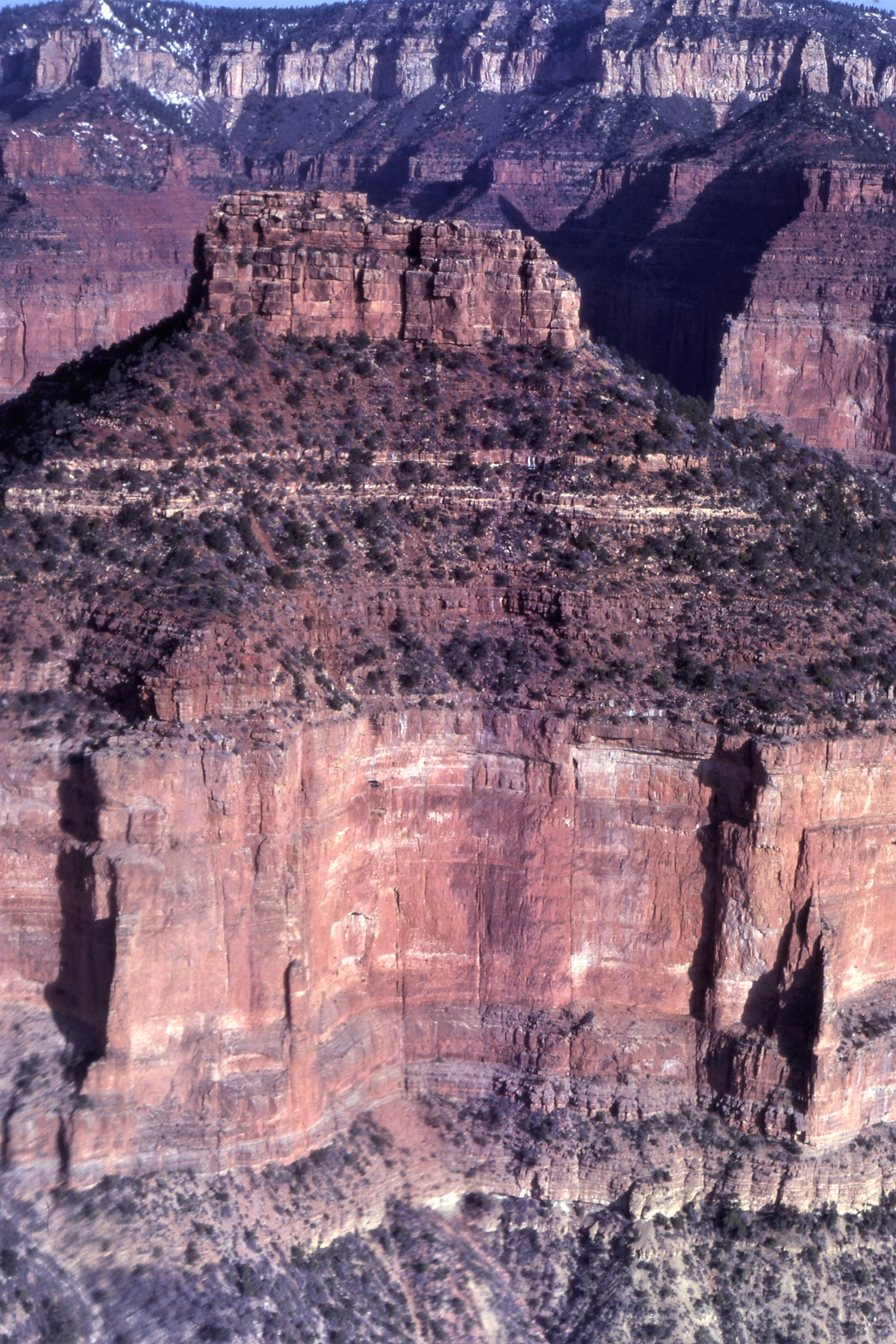
- Aerial view northwest toward south side of Alsap Butte, upper Nankoweap Canyon. Gray Esplanade Sandstone cliff, overlying red slope of Wescogame Formation, overlying white Manakacha Formation, overlying red ledges of Watahomigi Formation, overlying large gray cliff of Redwall Limestone
- Type: Geologic formation
- Unit of: Supai Group
- Underlies: Manakacha Formation
- Overlies: Surprise Canyon Formation or Redwall Limestone

Location
- Region: Arizona
- Country: United States
- Extent: Grand Canyon

Type section
- Named for: Watahomigi Point
- Named by: E.H. McKee
- Year defined: 1975

The Watahomigi Formation is a geologic formation in the Grand Canyon region of Arizona. It preserves fossils dating back to the Carboniferous period.

== See also ==
- List of fossiliferous stratigraphic units in Arizona
- Paleontology in Arizona
