= Cliff-former =

Bedrock resistant to erosion that produces outcrops with high slope angles

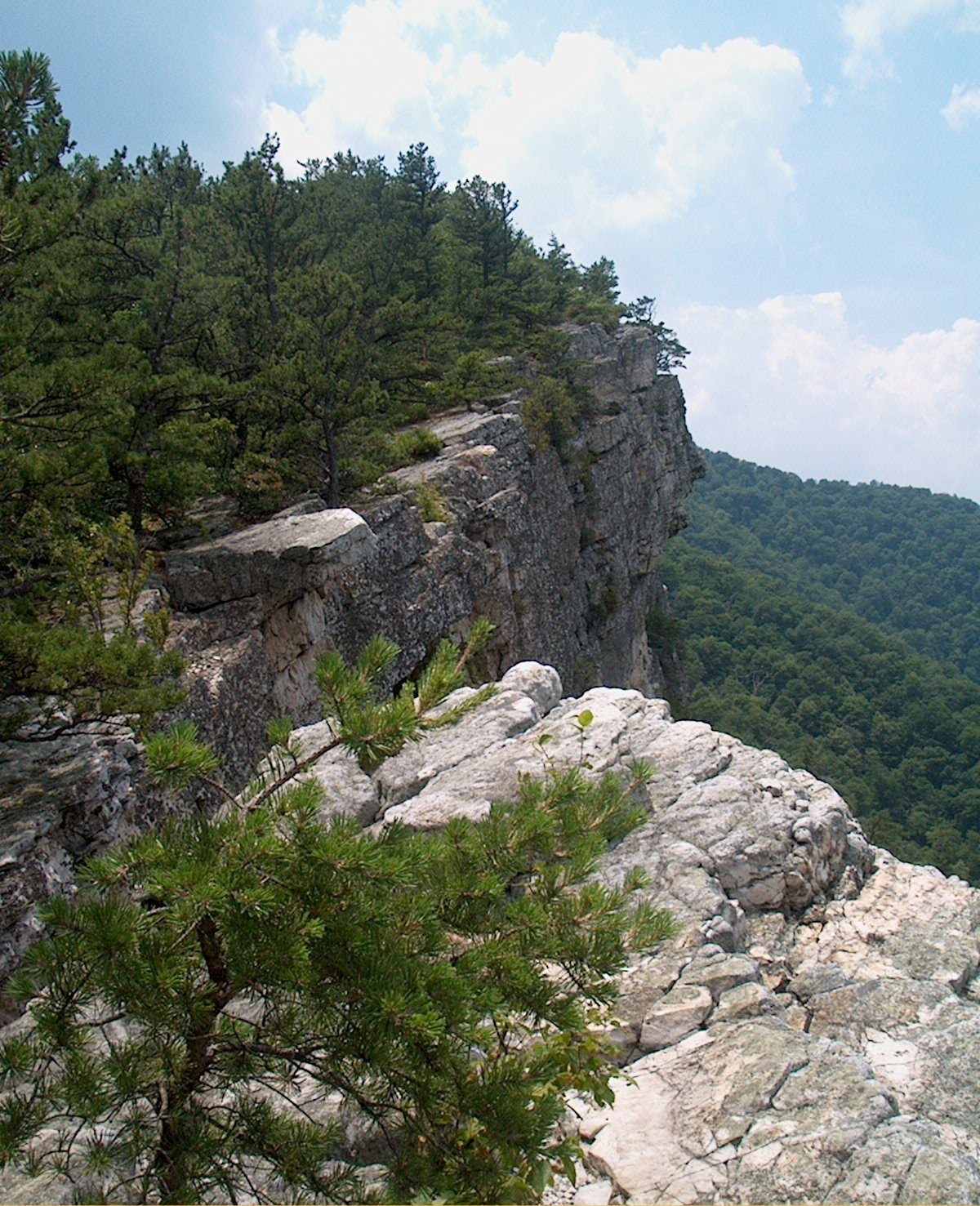
Cliff-forming Tuscarora Quartzite outcrop in West Virginia

A cliff-former is a geological unit of bedrock that is more resistant to erosion than overlying or underlying strata and consequently produces outcrops with high slope angles. It is more or less equivalent to ridge-former, and may be contrasted with slope-former. In humid environments, sandstones are typically cliff-formers. In arid environments, limestones are often cliff-formers also. Recent lavas may be cliff-formers as well.

In the Ridge-and-Valley Appalachians of the eastern United States the major ridge-formers are the Tuscarora, Pocono, and Pottsville Formations.
