= Slope-former =

Bedrock unit

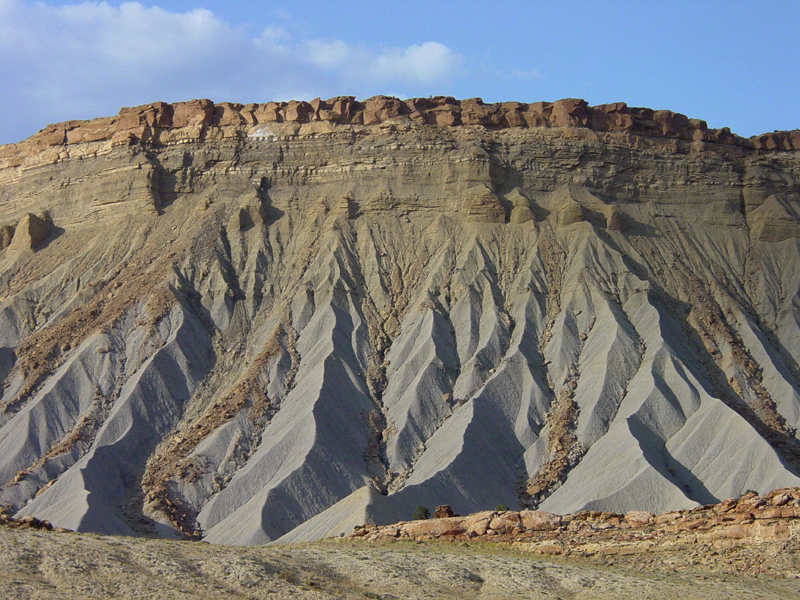
Gray slope-forming Mancos Shale below resistant sandstone caprock in the Capital Reef area of Utah

A slope-former is a unit of bedrock which is less resistant to erosion than overlying or underlying units and consequently results in outcrops with low relative slope angles. It may be contrasted with cliff-former. Typical slope forming lithologies include shales, and limestones in humid environments.
