= Cardenas Butte =

Summit in the Grand Canyon, Arizona

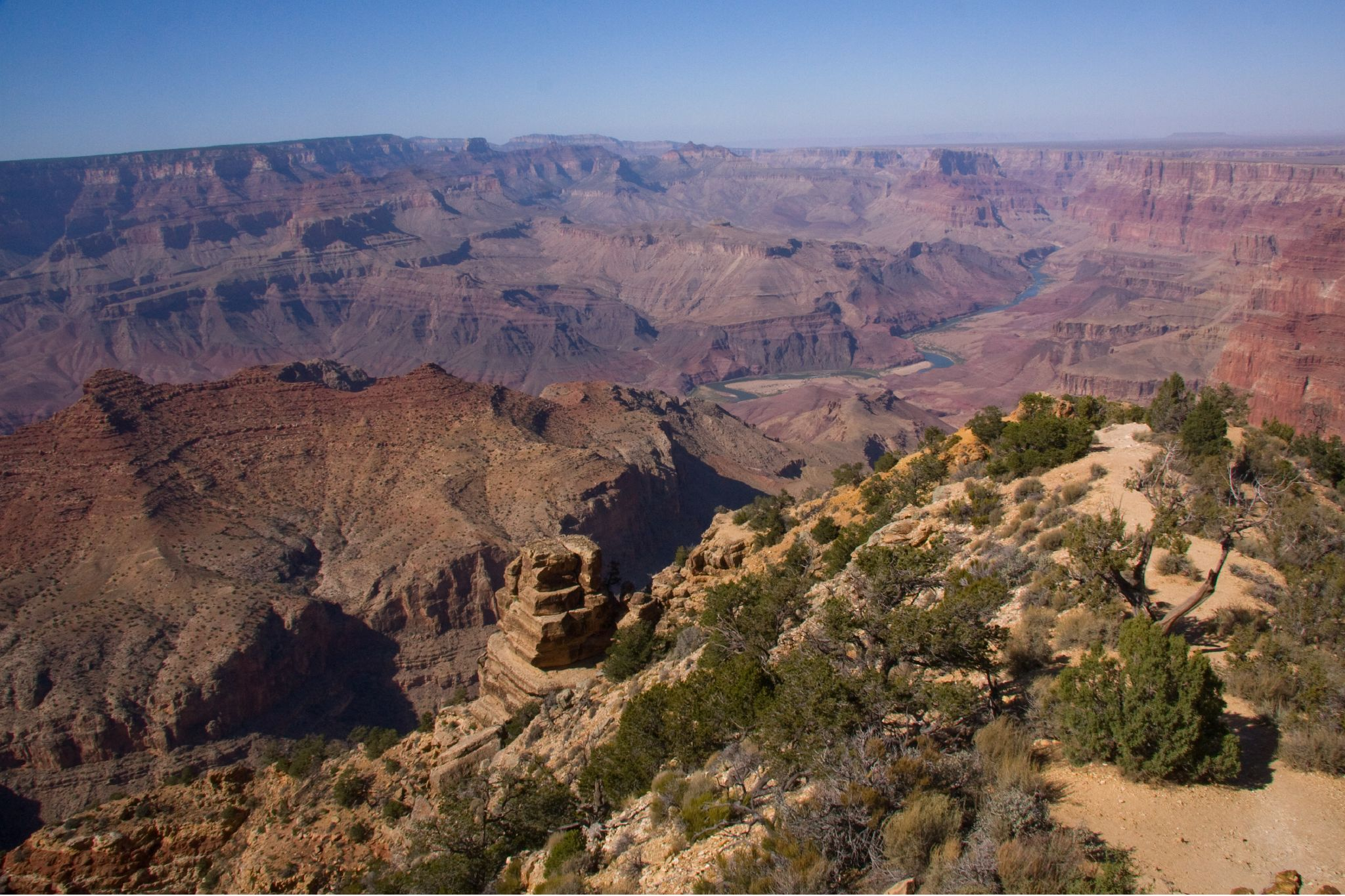
- Cardenas Butte-(left, (Esplanade Sandstone)), lower butte (Manakacha Formation-(shelf-center-left))

Highest point
- Elevation: 6,281 ft (1,914 m)
- Prominence: 481 ft (147 m)
- Parent peak: Escalante Butte
- Isolation: 0.80 mi (1.29 km)
- Coordinates: 36°03′34″N 111°50′34″W

Geography
- Location within Arizona Location within the United States
- Location: Grand Canyon National Park; Coconino County, Arizona, US
- Parent range: Coconino Plateau; Colorado Plateau
- Topo map: USGS Desert View

Geology
- Rock age: Pennsylvanian down to Cambrian
- Mountain type(s): sedimentary rock: sandstone, siltstone, mudstone, sandstone, shale
- Rock type(s): Supai Group-(eroded ridgeline), Redwall Limestone, Muav Limestone, Bright Angel Shale

Cardenas Butte is a 6,281-foot-elevation summit located in the eastern Grand Canyon, in Coconino County of northern Arizona, Southwestern United States. Cardenas Butte is named for García López de Cárdenas, the first European to see the Grand Canyon. The butte is located on a dp orange-red ridgeline of the Supai Group, adjacent its higher elevation neighbor, Escalante Butte; both buttes are ~1.5 miles north-northwest of Navajo Point in far eastern South Rim, approaching the East Rim.

Cardenas Butte (and Escalante) are drained on the east by Tanner Canyon, north to the Colorado River; the northwest of Cardenas Butte is drained northwest by Cardenas Creek, and north by an unnamed drainage. The Tanner Trail from Navajo Point, courses the east, upper ridges of Escalante, then Cardenas Butte, upon the Supai Group, until the trail drops down through the Redwall Limestone, at the Supai ridgeline terminus. Cardenas Butte and Escalante Butte have similar elevations, with Escalante about 300 ft higher, and westwards up the burnt-orange-red ridgeline.

== Geology of Cardenas and Escalante Buttes ==
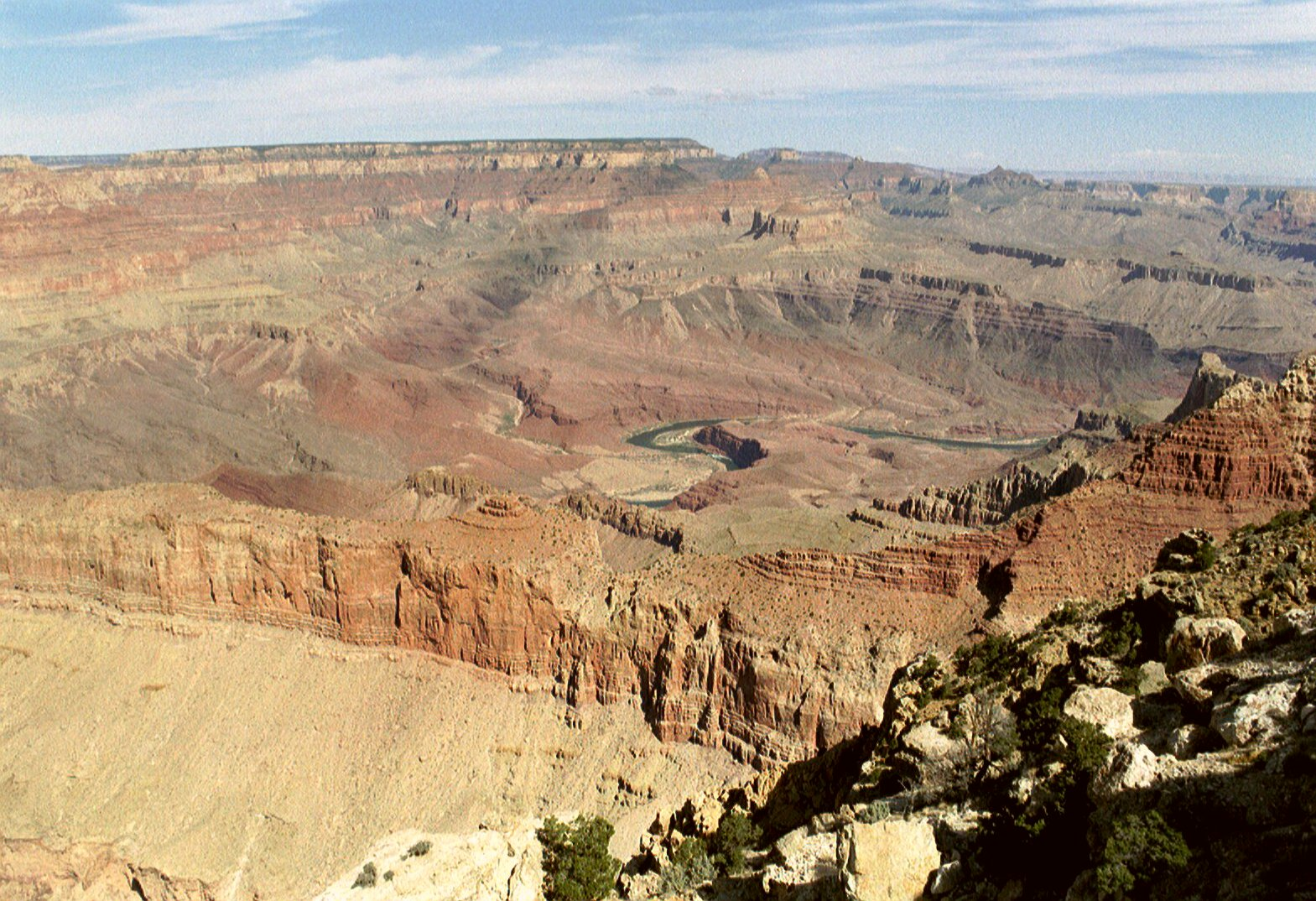
Coconino Sandstone-prominence, Hermit Formation, Supai Group (4-units), Redwall Limestone, Muav Limestone, Bright Angel Shale.

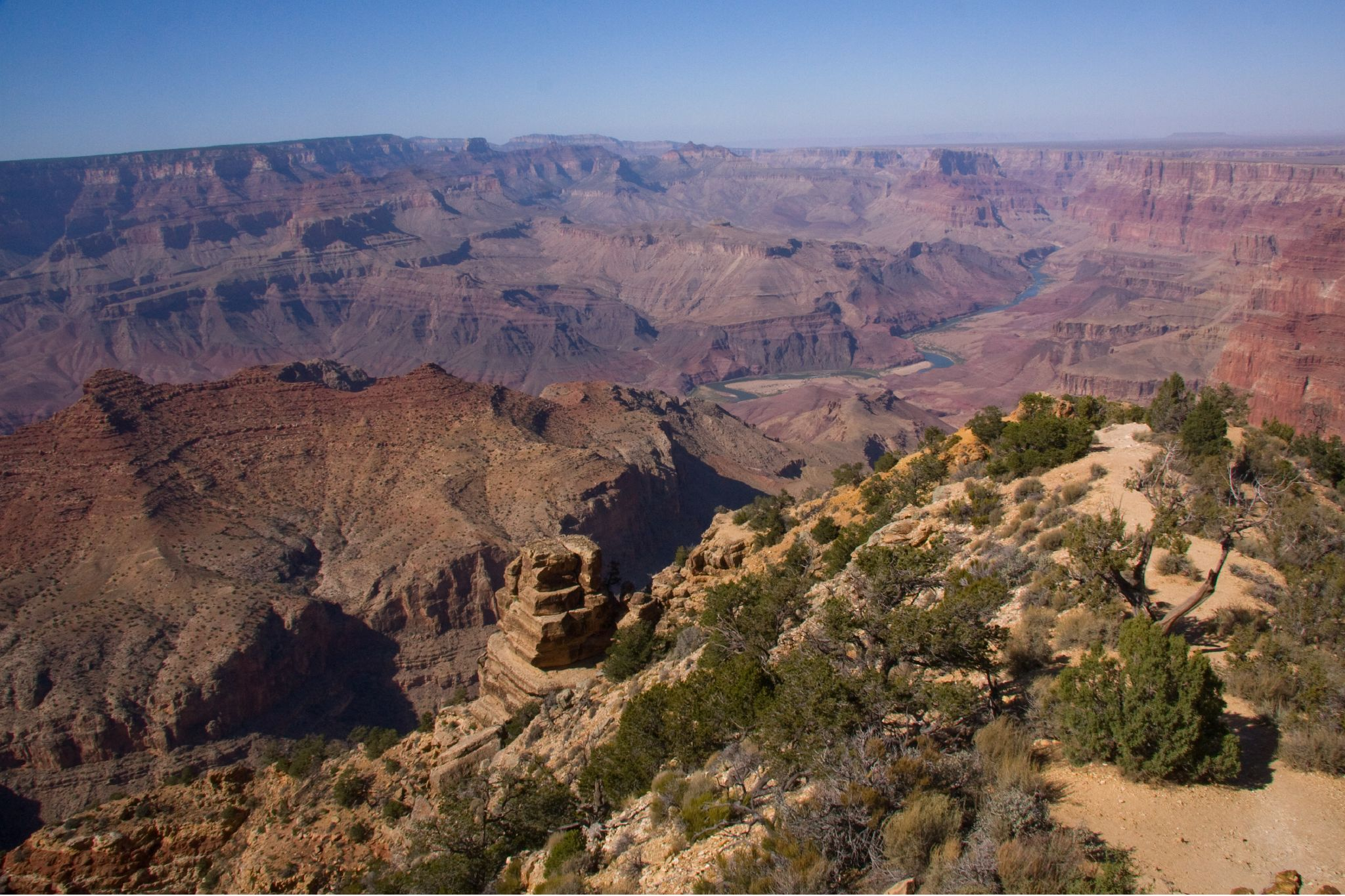
Escalante Butte (left), Cardenas Butte (center-left)

Cardenas Butte and Escalante Butte lie upon the same Supai Group ridgeline. At the west, Escalante is separated by a ridge saddle (the drainage southeast into Upper Tanner Canyon). Escalante Butte prominence is a small, heavily eroded cliff and debris remainder of Coconino Sandstone (on Hermit Shale), on eroded ridges of the Supai Group.

Cardenas Butte, is about 300 ft lower than Escalante Butte, and 0.8 mi east, on an eroded ridgeline of Supai Group. Its small spire is a surviving cliff-former unit of the Supai Group, the cliff and shelf of the Esplanade Sandstone. A small amount of debris-remainder may survive on the surface of the prominence-shelf, the slope-former Hermit Shale.

== See also ==
- Geology of the Grand Canyon area
- List of Supai Group prominences in the Grand Canyon
