= Escalante Butte =

Geologic prominence in northern Arizona, United States

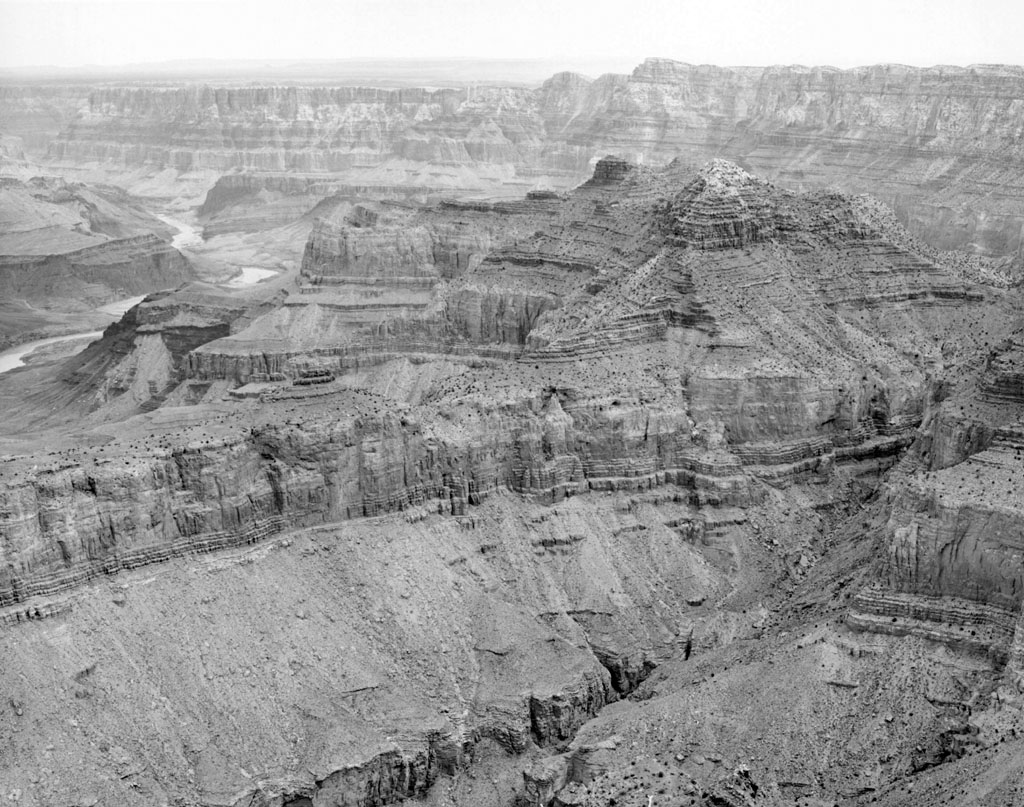
- southwest aspect (shows long platform northwestwards of top of Redwall Limestone)

Highest point
- Elevation: 6,536 ft (1,992 m)
- Prominence: 876 ft (267 m)
- Parent peak: Navajo Point (South Rim)
- Coordinates: 36.0492°N 111.8498°W – GNIS Data

Geography
- Location within Arizona Location within the United States
- Location: Grand Canyon; Coconino County, Arizona, U.S.
- Topo map: USGS Desert View

Geology
- Rock age: Permian down to Cambrian
- Mountain type(s): sedimentary rock: sandstone, shale, siltstone, mudstone, sandstone, shale
- Rock type(s): Coconino Sandstone-(prominence), Hermit Shale, Supai Group-(eroded ridgeline), Redwall Limestone, Muav Limestone, Bright Angel Shale

Escalante Butte is a 6,536-foot (1,992 m) prominence adjacent the far eastern South Rim of the Grand Canyon, of Northern Arizona. Adjacent east is a lower elevation butte, Cardenas Butte. Both buttes, (and the South Rim), are part of the western drainage of north-trending Tanner Canyon into the Colorado River.

== Geology – Escalante & Cardenas Buttes ==
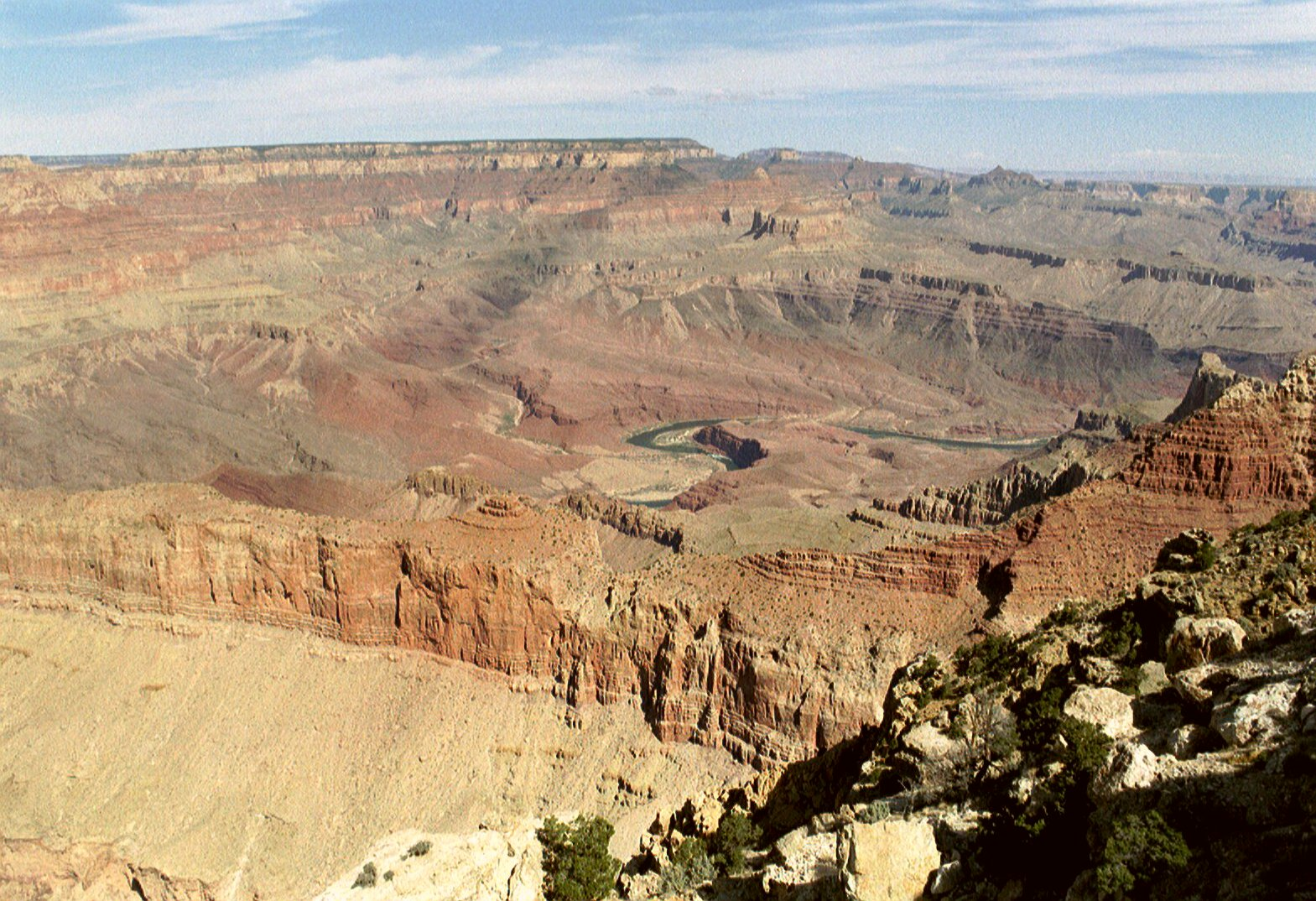
Escalante Butte, Prominence and rock units: Coconino Sandstone-prominence, Hermit Formation, Supai Group (4-units), Redwall Limestone, Muav Limestone, Bright Angel Shale.

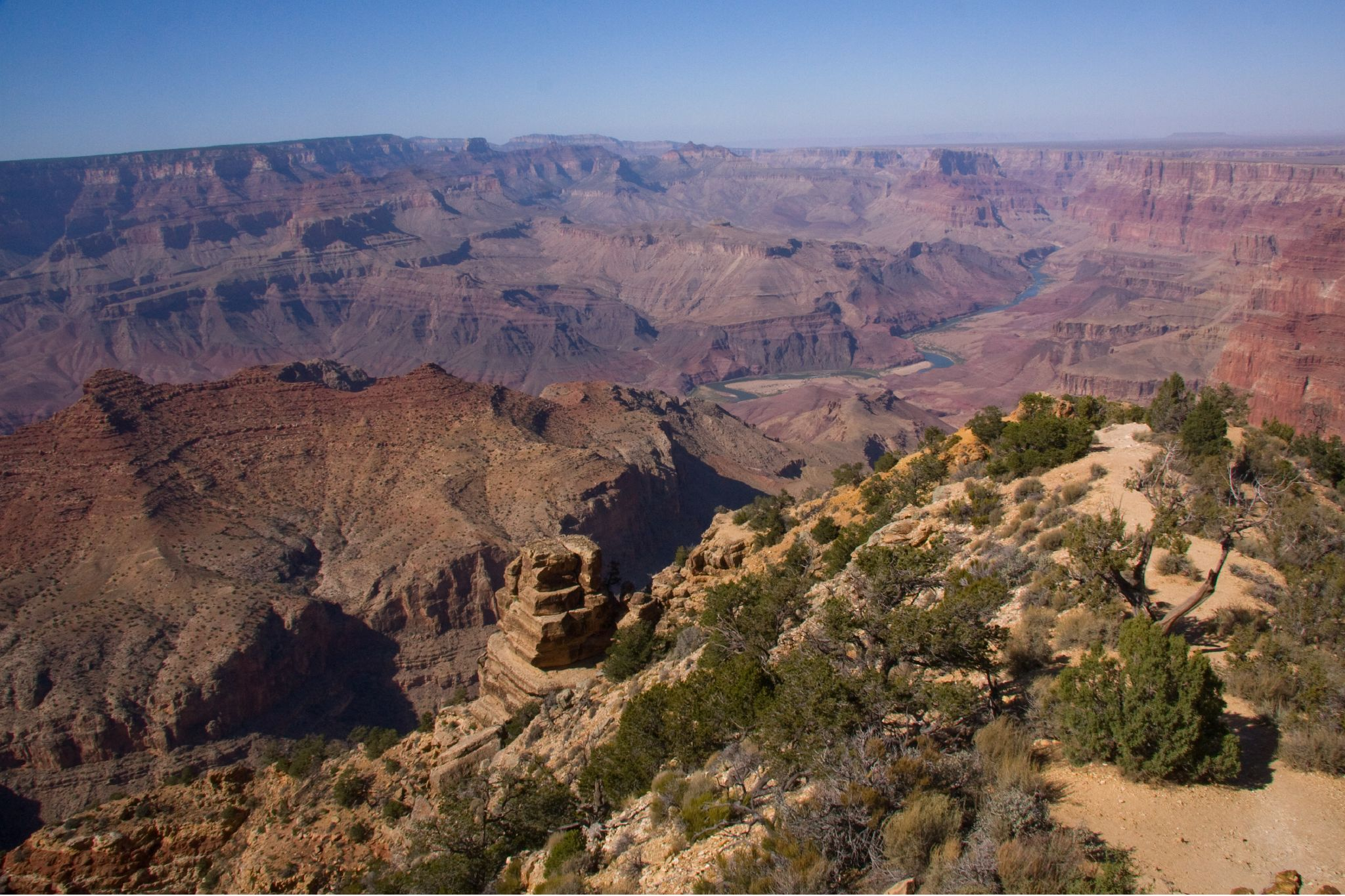
Cardenas Butte – (left) on ridgeline

Escalante Butte and Cardenas Butte lie upon the same Supai Group ridgeline. At the west, Escalante is separated by a ridge saddle (the drainage southeast into Upper Tanner Canyon). Escalante Butte prominence is a small, heavily eroded cliff and debris remainder of Coconino Sandstone, (on debris of Hermit Shale), on eroded ridges of the Supai Group. Cardenas Butte, is about 300 feet (91 m) lower, 0.8 miles (1.3 km) east, on an eroded ridgeline of Supai Group. Its small spire is a surviving cliff-former unit of the Supai Group.

== See also ==
- Geology of the Grand Canyon area
- Escalante Route
- Tanner Trail
