= Frenchman Mountain Dolostone =

Cambrian geologic formation found in the Southwestern United States

- Stratigraphic range: Middle Cambrian; 498–497 Ma
- Type: Geological formation
- Unit of: Tonto Group
- Underlies: Temple Butte Formation in Frenchmen Mountain to western Grand Canyon. Redwall Limestone and locally Temple Butte Formation in central Grand Canyon.
- Overlies: Muav Limestone
- Thickness: up to 370 m (1,210 ft)

Lithology
- Primary: dolomite
- Other: shale

Location
- Region: Northern Arizona (Grand Canyon) and southern Nevada
- Country: United States

Type section
- Named for: Frenchman Mountain, Nevada
- Named by: V. S. Korolev and K. E. Karlstrom, S. M. Rowland and others
- Location: Frenchman Mountain, Nevada
- Year defined: 2023
- Coordinates: 36.1915°N 115.0076°W
- Region: Southern Nevada
- Country: United States
- Thickness at type section: 370 m (1,210 ft)

The Frenchman Mountain Dolostone is the uppermost and youngest of five Cambrian geologic formations that comprise the Tonto Group. It consists of beds of mottled white to gray dolomite often separated by thin seams of shale, especially in its lower part. In the Grand Canyon, this formation forms vertical cliffs that thicken westward between the top of the Muav Limestone and the base of either the Devonian Temple Butte Formation or Mississippian Redwall Limestone. Because of unidentified trace fossils and lack of datable body fossils, the Frenchman Mountain Dolostone exact age is uncertain. Within the Grand Canyon, its thickness varies between 61 and 137 m (200 and 449 ft). West into the Lake Mead region, it thickens considerably and is 370 m (1,210 ft) thick at Frenchman Mountain near Las Vegas, Nevada.

== Nomenclature ==
Until 2020, the Frenchman Mountain Dolostone was also informally called at one time either the supra-Muav, Grand Wash Dolomite, subdivision A, or Cambrian undifferentiated dolomites until formally assigned to and renamed as the Frenchman Mountain Dolostone. In some publications, the dolomite beds comprising the Frenchman Mountain Dolostone is ignored and only the Muav Limestone is illustrated.

In 1875, G. K. Gilbert first mapped the Tonto Group within the Grand Canyon. He also subdivided it, from base to top, into the Tonto sandstone, Tonto shale, and Marbled Limestone.

In 1914, Gilbert's three subdivisions of the Tonto Group were renamed by L. F. Noble. The Tonto sandstone was renamed as the Tapeats Sandstone. The Tonto shale was renamed as the Bright Angel Shale. The Marbled limestone was renamed as the Muav Limestone. L. F. Noble redefined his Muav Limestone as being the "...predominantly calcareous part of the Tonto group" lying beneath either the discontinuous lenses of overlying Devonian beds or base of the Redwall Limestone and overlying the Bright Angel Shale.

In 1922, the Muav Limestone was subdivided by L F. Noble into four informal subdivisions. From top to base, they are subdivision A, bluff massive dolomite; subdivision B, gray cross-bedded sandstone; subdivision C, thin-bedded mottled limestone; and subdivision D, basal thin-bedded mottle limestone.

Later in 1945, E. D. McKee and C. E. Resser removed subdivision A of L F. Noble from both the Muav Limestone and the Tonto Group. It assigned it to an informal geologic unit called the Cambrian undifferentiated dolomites. This action created an informal formation-rank geologic unit composed entirely of dolomite that overlies the limestone beds of the Muav Limestone. As discussed in detail by S. M. Rowland and others, Between 1945 and 2020, the Cambrian undifferentiated dolomites have also been informally referred to as either the supra-Muav, Grand Wash Dolomite, and the Frenchman Mountain Dolostone. The Cambrian undifferentiated dolomites was formally named the Frenchman Mountain Dolostone and restored to the Tonto Group.

== Description ==
In the Grand Canyon and using the informal name, Cambrian undifferentiated dolomites, E. D. McKee and C. E. Resser recognized three types of dolostone within the Frenchman Mountain Dolostone. They are a white to buff, granular, hard, massive dolomite; a white to yellow, aphanitic (porcelain-textured), thin-bedded dolomite; and a steel-gray, fine-grained, thick-bedded dolomite. the Grand Canyon, all of these dolomites are pervasively dolomitized to dolomicrite and the original textures obliterated beyond all recognition. The thin-bedded dolomite exhibits fine irregular laminae on weathered surfaces. The thick-bedded dolomite has olive, silty weathering surfaces and forms resistant cliffs. Thin layers of shale (mudstone) frequently separate dolomite beds, especially in the lower part of this formation.

The dolomites of the Frenchman Mountain Dolostone distinctly differ in both lithology and weathering characteristics from the limestones and dolomites of the underlying Muav Limestone. Typically, limestones and dolomites at the top of the Muav Limestone are darker and more resistant to erosion than those at the base of the Frenchman Mountain Dolostone. These differences are why E. D. McKee and C. E. Resser recognized and mapped the Frenchman Mountain Dolostone as separate stratigraphic unit from the Muav Limestone.

In the Lake Mead region and Frenchman Mountain, the dolomites of the Frenchman Mountain Dolostone consist of thick beds of oolitic grainstones and stromatolites that are interbedded with the fine-grained dolomites. These dolomites mostly retain their original sedimentary textures despite dolomitization. The sedimentary structures include wavy and asymmetric ripple laminations and small-scale cross-stratification. Trace fossils consist mainly of horizontal burrows and tracks.

From a thickness of 370 m (1,210 ft) at Frenchman Mountain, the Frenchman Mountain Dolostone thins eastward to 362 m (1,188 ft) at Tramp Ridge in the Gold Butte National Monument and 270 m (890 ft) at Devils Cove in the Gold Butte National Monument. East of the Grand Wash fault and in the Grand Canyon region, its thickness decreases abruptly to 52 m (171 ft) at Quartermaster Canyon, 106 m (348 ft) at 269-Mile Canyon, and 70 m (230 ft) near Diamond Bar Ranch. Further eastward in the Grand Canyon region, the thickness of the Frenchman Mountain Dolostone gradually decreases to 52 m (171 ft) in Fern Glen Canyon. and 20 m (66 ft) at Blacktail Canyon. The abrupt change in its thickness on either side of the Grand Wash fault suggests that this fault was active during the Cambrian Period. In its eastern Grand Canyon (Marble Canyon), the Frenchman Mountain Dolostone is 30 m (98 ft) thick at 50-Mile and decreases to only being 8 m (26 ft) thick at Palisades of the Desert.

== Fossils ==
Except for Drumian trilobites found in the lower few meters of the Frenchman Mountain Dolostone, it lacks identifiable body fossils. The only fossils typically found in the bulk of the Frenchman Mountain Dolostone are undescribed and unstudied, invertebrate horizontal burrows and trails.

In the eastern Grand Canyon, fossil trilobites occur in the uppermost Muav Formation and basal few meters of the Frenchman Mountain Dolostone. This Drumian trilobite fauna consists of Glyphaspis tetonensis, Crepicephalus? upis, Solenopleurella? quadrata, and Modocia sp. These trilobites are all associated with the Bolaspidella Biozone.

== Depositional environment ==
Based upon sedimentary structures and stratigraphy, the Frenchman Mountain Dolostone is interpreted as shallow subtidal to possibly intertidal in depositional environments associated with a regressing sea.

== Age ==
The Frenchman Mountain Dolostone ranges in age from the Drumian to early Paibian. This age range is based upon the presence of (1.) Drumian trilobite fossils of the Bolaspidella Biozone collected from the basal two meters of the formation and underlying Muav Formation in the eastern Grand Canyon; (2.) the Drumian Carbon Isotope Excursion (DICE) near the base of this formation; and (3.) the onset of the Steptoean Positive Carbon Isotope Excursion (SPICE) at its top. This range in age only occurs in the western Grand Canyon and Frenchman Mountains. Further east, this formation is truncated unconformably by Devonian and Mississippian strata. As a result, only the lower, early Paibian, strata of Frenchman Mountain Dolostone is preserved. The younger parts of it are absent either because of nondeposition, later erosion, or and combination of both processes.

== See also ==
- Geology of the Grand Canyon area
- Sauk sequence
