= Temple Butte Formation =

Landform in the Grand Canyon, Arizona

- Stratigraphic range: Middle to Late Devonian 409–363 Ma
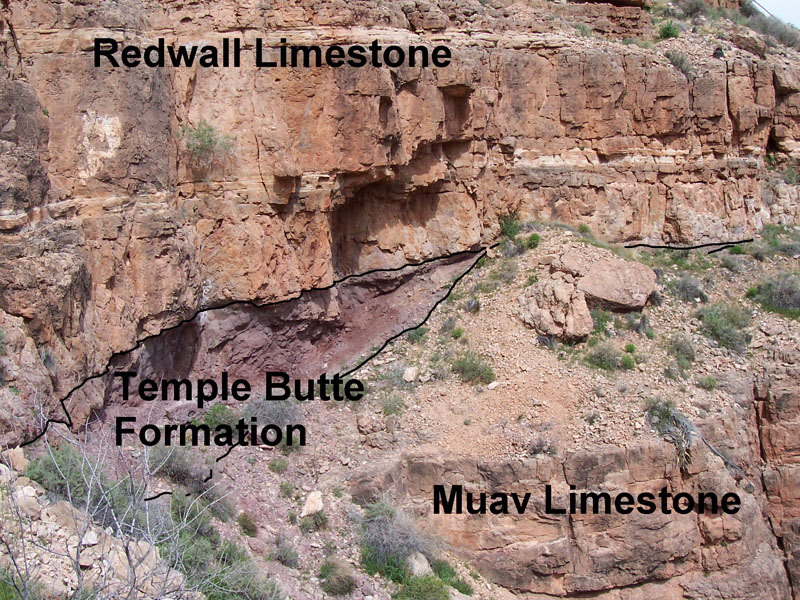
- Type: Geological formation
- Underlies: Redwall Limestone
- Overlies: either Muav Limestone or Frenchman Mountain Dolostone of Tonto Group
- Thickness: 30 m (98 ft), at maximum

Lithology
- Primary: dolomite
- Other: sandstone, mudstone, and limestone

Location
- Region: Northern Arizona (Grand Canyon), central Arizona, and southern Nevada
- Country: United States

Type section
- Named for: Temple Butte, Coconino County, Arizona.
- Named by: Walcott (1889)

The Devonian Temple Butte Formation, also called Temple Butte Limestone, outcrops through most of the Grand Canyon of Arizona, USA; it also occurs in southeast Nevada. Within the eastern Grand Canyon, it consists of thin, discontinuous and relatively inconspicuous lenses that fill paleovalleys cut into the underlying Muav Limestone. Within these paleovalleys, it at most, is only about 100 feet (30 m) thick at its maximum. Within the central and western Grand Canyon, the exposures are continuous. However, they tend to merge with cliffs of the much thicker and overlying Redwall Limestone.

Within the western and central parts of the Grand Canyon, the Temple Butte Formation consists of a westward thickening layer of interbedded dolomite, sandy dolomite, sandstone, mudstone, and limestone that vary in color from purple, reddish-purple, dark gray, to light-gray. Within the eastern part of the Grand Canyon, the Temple Butte Formation fills shallow paleovalleys, which are eroded into the underlying Tonto Group. The Temple Butte strata filling these paleovalleys consist of interbedded mudstone, sandstone, dolomite, and conglomerate – that vary in color from purple, reddish-purple, to light gray. Typically, the paleovalley-fill consists of a distinct pale, reddish purple dolomite or sandy dolomite. These paleovalleys range in depth from as much as 30 m (98 ft), to as shallow as 12 m (39 ft).

== Contacts ==
The upper and lower contacts of the Temple Butte Formation are major unconformities. Within the Grand Canyon region, its base is a major unconformity within the Paleozoic rock record. The time represented by this unconfomity spans about 100 million years, including part of Late Cambrian, all of Ordovician and Silurian, and most of Early and Middle Devonian time. The upper contact is a disconformity that typically consists of nearly horizontal surfaces with little or no relief and overlain locally by a basal conglomerate within the overlying Redwall Limestone.

== Frenchman Mountain ==
Within the area of Frenchman Mountain, Clark County, Nevada, over 610 m (2,000 ft) of limestone and dolomite occupy the interval between the Muav and Redwall limestones, whereas in the Grand Canyon exist less than 30 m (98 ft) of Temple Butte Formation. These limestone and dolomite beds represent sediments that accumulated during the period of time represented by the two disconformities that form the upper and lower contacts of the Temple Butte Formation in the Grand Canyon.

== Fossils ==
Despite the occurrence of abundant marine invertebrate and vertebrate fossils within the laterally and temporally equivalent Jerome Member of the Martin Formation in central Arizona, the Temple Butte Formation has yielded surprisingly few identifiable fossils within its Grand Canyon outcrops. These fossils include indeterminate brachiopods, gastropods, corals and placoganoid fish from the walls of lower Kanab Canyon and fish plates identified as Bothriolepis from Sapphire Canyon. Possible cylindrical trace fossils occur in dolomite beds near the base of the Temple Butte at the type section and Tuckup Canyon. Finally, latest Givetian to late Frasnian conodonts have been recovered from the Temple Butte Formation at Matkatamiba Canyon at River Mile 148.4.

West of the Grand Canyon, fossils have been recovered from the Temple Butte Formation, where it is also known as the Sultan Limestone. From outcrops that form parts of Iceberg Ridge in Mohave County, Arizona, and the Lake Mead National Recreation Area, rare silicified corals, crinoid plates, gastropods, and massive stromatoporoid colonies have been found in dolomite outcrops of the Temple Butte Formation (Sultan Limestone). In addition, the upper 25 m (82 ft) of the Temple Butte Formation at Iceberg Ridge contains Famennian conodonts. Finally, farther to the north in Nevada, on South Virgin Peak Ridge, an outcrop of quartz arenite and pinkish-gray sandy dolomite at the base of Temple Butte Formation, has yielded fossil fish plates identified as Holonema, Asterolepis and sarcopterygians of middle Devonian age.

== See also ==
- Geology of the Grand Canyon area

== Popular Publications ==
- Blakey, R, and W Ranney (2008) Ancient Landscapes of the Colorado Plateau. Grand Canyon Association, Grand Canyon Village, Arizona. 176 pp. ISBN 978-1934656037
- Chronic, H (1983) Roadside Geology of Arizona. 23rd printing, Mountain Press Publishing Company, Missoula, Montana. 332 pp. ISBN 978-0-87842-147-3
- Lucchitta, I (2001) Hiking Arizona's Geology. Mountaineers's Books, Seattle Washington. 290 pp. ISBN 0-89886-730-4
