= Kraytdraco =

Kraytdraco Temporal range: Middle Cambrian

Scientific classification
- Kingdom: Animalia
- Phylum: Priapulida
- Class: incertae sedis
- Genus: †Kraytdraco; Mussini et al., 2025
- Species: †K. spectatus

Binomial name
- †Kraytdraco spectatus Mussini et al., 2025

Extinct genus of priapulid worm

Kraytdraco is an extinct genus of priapulid worm from the Middle Cambrian Bright Angel Shale. It contains one species, Kraytdraco spectatus, known from fossils of its pharyngeal teeth. It is thought to have been a detritivore.

== Discovery and naming ==
Kraytdraco was discovered in the Bright Angel Shale, loecated in Grand Canyon National Park, Arizona, USA. The fossils were retrieved from the rock using hydrofluoric acid.

The generic name references the fictional krayt dragon from Star Wars (with draco being Latin for dragon). This name was chosen because the krayt dragon is somewhat worm-like, has many teeth, and lives in canyons. The specific name comes from the Latin spectatus, meaning "remarkable", in reference to Kraytdraco's relatively large size and the well-preserved nature of the fossils.

== Description ==
Kraytdraco is only known from its pharyngeal teeth, which bear numerous filaments. Estimates based on partially articulated specimens suggest Kraytdraco had a total body length between 1.5 and 4 cm (roughly 0.6 to 1.6 in) in length, using the proportions of Ottoia. However, some isolated Kraytdraco teeth have been discovered that are larger than in the articulated specimens, suggesting a larger overall body size. Based on this, the articulated specimens are thought to be juveniles.

== Paleobiology ==
Kraytdraco's teeth were poorly sclerotized and delicate in nature, suggesting that Kraytdraco was not macropredatory like some other priapulids. Instead, Kraytdraco may have been a deposit feeder like the modern priapulid Tubiluchus, whose teeth show some morphological similarities with Kraytdraco. However, since Kraytdraco is much larger than Tubiluchus, it likely fed on larger food items.

== Paleoecology ==
Unlike most Cambrian fossil localities, which were often anoxic and poor in resources, the Bright Angel Shale appears to have been a fairly oxygenated, shallow-water environment with abundant resources. The derived morphologies of many taxa from the Bright Angel Shale, including Kraytdraco, may be indicative of evolutionary escalation — a continuous process leading organisms to develop new adaptations in response to their "enemies", like predators, competitors, and parasites. The resource-rich environment of the Bright Angel Shale may have promoted evolutionary escalation because adaptations created as a result of evolutionary escalation are often energetically costly, and because in these types of environments, selective pressures exerted by other organisms (rather than those exerted by abiotic factors) tend to be the primary forces driving evolution.

Kraytdraco coexisted with molluscs showing adaptations for substrate-scraping and with crustaceans thought to have been filter-feeders. Probable algae and cyanobacteria are also known from the shale.
