= Tonto Group =

Cambrian geologic unit in the Grand Canyon region, Arizona

- Stratigraphic range: Cambrian, 507–497 Ma
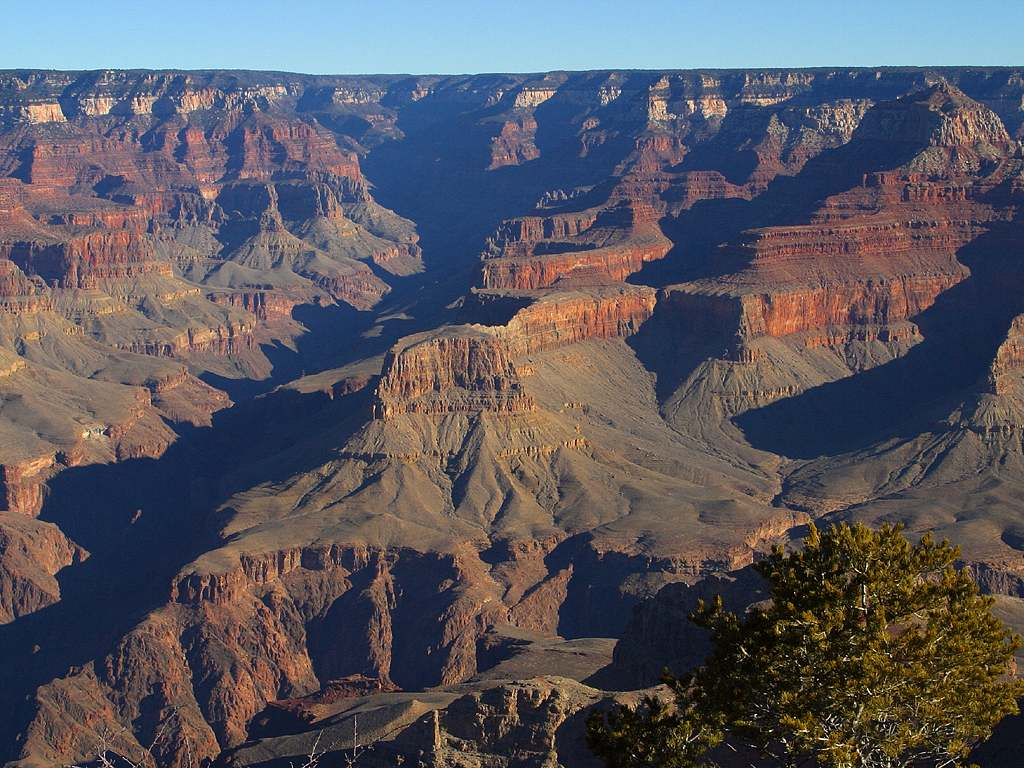
- Muav Limestone-(broader-based gray cliff supporting tall-reddish Redwall Limestone cliff) and Bright Angel Shale-(greenish & extensive slope-former), resting on Tapeats Sandstone-(short, dark vertical cliff on gorge rim) and the Tonto Platform, inner canyon, Granite Gorge (the two units are easily seen below the red-stained Redwall Limestone (~550 ft thick))
- Type: Geologic group
- Unit of: Sauk sequence
- Sub-units: Frenchman Mountain Dolostone, Muav Limestone, Bright Angel Shale, Tapeats Sandstone, and Sixtymile Formation
- Underlies: Redwall Limestone. (Locally underlies Temple Butte Formation that fills paleovalleys cut into unconformity separating Redwall Limestone from either Frenchman Mountain Dolostone or Muav Limestone.
- Overlies: Vishnu Basement Rocks and Grand Canyon Supergroup
- Thickness: 380 m (1,250 ft)

Lithology
- Primary: sandstone, conglomerate, siltstone, shale, limestone, and dolomite
- Other: calcareous mudstone and glauconitic sandstone

Location
- Region: Northern Arizona, Southern Nevada
- Country: United States

Type section
- Named for: Tonto Creek or Tonto Basin,
- Named by: G. K. Gilbert
- Location: Backtail Canyon

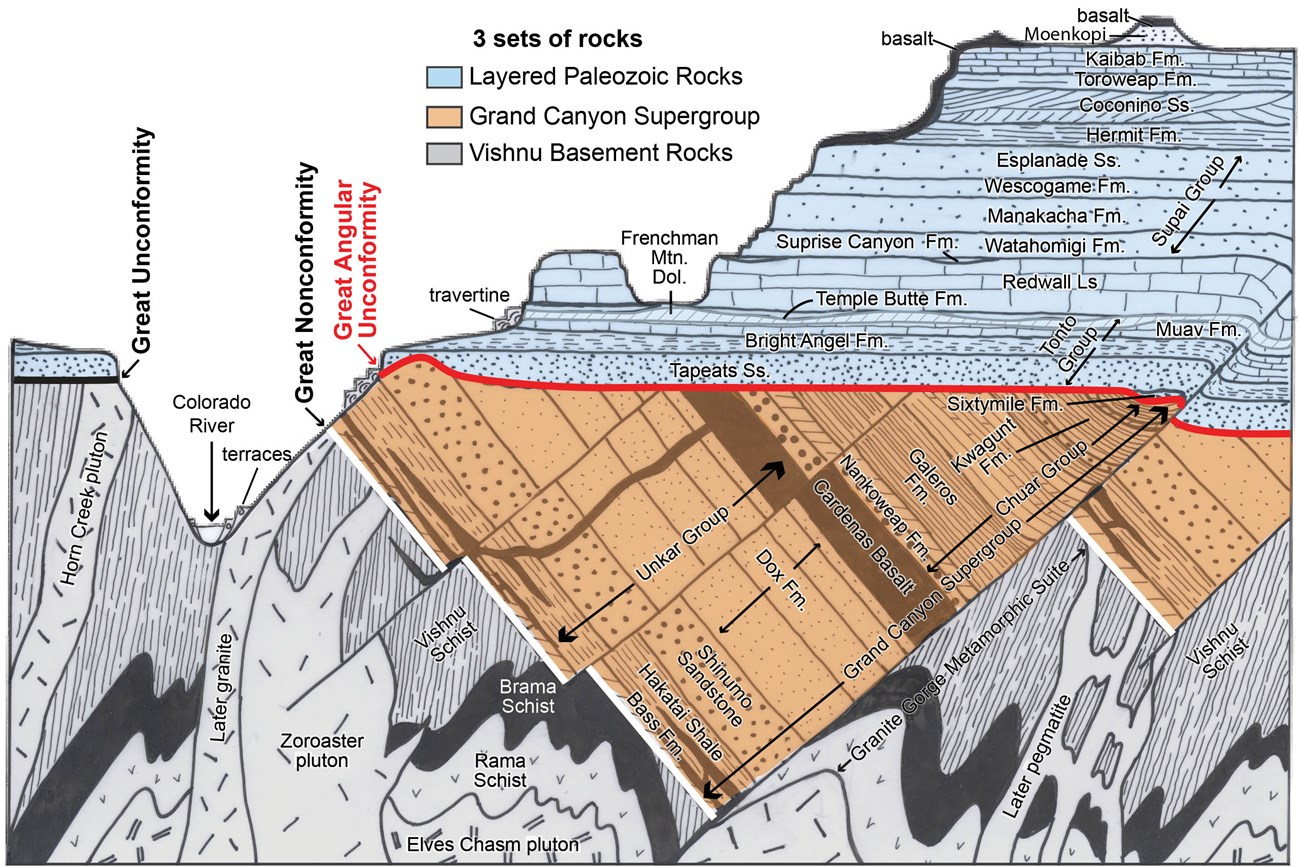
Figure 1. A geologic cross section of the Grand Canyon.

The Tonto Group is a name for an assemblage of related sedimentary strata, collectively known by geologists as a Group, that comprises the basal sequence Paleozoic strata exposed in the sides of the Grand Canyon. As currently defined, the Tonto groups consists of the Sixtymile Formation, Tapeats Sandstone, Bright Angel Shale (or Formation), Muav Limestone (or Formation), and Frenchman Mountain Dolostone. Historically, it included only the Tapeats Sandstone, Bright Angel Shale, and Muav Limestone. Because these units are defined by lithology and three of them interfinger and intergrade laterally, they lack the simple layer cake geology as they are typically portrayed as having and geological mapping of them is complicated.

== Nomenclature ==
In 1874 and 1875, G. K. Gilbert named the Tonto Group. Although it was mentioned that it outcropped in the Tonto Basin and the headwaters of Tonto Creek of south-central Arizona, he did not indicate which of these landforms, for which this group is named. Although the word tonto is translated as silly or foolish in Spanish, this place name for either Tonto Basin or Tonto Creek is derived from the Apache word, Koun’nde. This word means wild, rough people and refers to the indigenous Dilzhe’e Tonto Apache.

G. K. Gilbert also recognized that rocks similar to those found in the Tonto Basin are exposed near the bottom of the Grand Canyon and designated them also as the Tonto Group. From youngest to oldest, Gilbert subdivided the Tonto Group found in the Grand Canyon into the Marbled limestone (now subdivided into the Muav Limestone and Frenchman Dolostone); the Tonto shale (now the Bright Angel Shale); the Tonto sandstone (now the Tapeats Sandstone). However, he did not specify a specific type locality. Decades later, R. C. Rose proposed an exposure in Backtail Canyon for a type locality.

In 1914, L F. Noble officially redefined and renamed the formations comprising the Tonto Group. The Tonto sandstone was officially renamed the Tapeats Sandstone and the Tonto shale was officially renamed the Bright Angel Shale. The Marbled limestone was later officially renamed the Muav Limestone, which by Noble's definition consisted of an upper set of dolomite beds and a lower set of limestone beds.

Later in 1945, E. D. McKee and C. E. Resser subdivided the formations into a number of members in their recognition of the laterally gradation, time transgressive, and interfingering nature of the formations comprising the Tonto Group. In addition, they subdivided the Muav Limestone of Noble into undifferentiated dolomites, overlying an Muav Limestone composed entirely of the lower limestone strata. Furthermore, they removed the undifferentiated dolomites from the Tonto Group. Recently, the undifferentiated dolomites, now known as the Frenchman Mountain Dolostone, have been restore as a formation within the Tonto Group. In addition, along with the Frenchman Mountain Dolostone, the Sixtymile Formation is regarded to be part of the Tonto Group.

Throughout the majority of it extent, the Tonto Group lies unconformably on underlying Precambrian rocks forming the Great Unconformity. This contact is either an angular unconformity truncating tilted strata of the Grand Canyon Supergroup or a nonconformity cut into the crystalline Vishnu Basement Rocks. The base of the Tonto Group consists of discontinuous beds of the Sixtymile Formation at Nankoweap Butte and within Awatubi and Sixtymile Canyons in the eastern Grand Canyon.

== Description ==
As currently defined Tonto Group consists of the Sixtymile Formation, Tapeats Sandstone, Bright Angel Shale, Muav Limestone, and Frenchman Mountain Dolostone.

The Sixtymile Formation is a very thin accumulation of sandstone, siltstone, and breccia underlying the Tapeats Sandstone. It is exposed only atop Nankoweap Butte and within Awatubi and Sixtymile Canyons in the eastern Grand Canyon, Arizona. Sixtymile Formation is preserved only in a broad asymmetric fold, called the Chuar syncline. The maximum thickness of the Sixtymile Formation is about 60 m (200 ft). The actual depositional thickness of the Sixtymile Formation is unknown owing to erosion prior to deposition of the Tapeats Sandstone. The Sixtymile Formation unconformably overlies the Chur Group. No fossils have been reported from the Sixtymile Formation.

In the Grand Canyon, the Tapeats Sandstone is a medium- to coarse-grained, thin-bedded, cliff-forming conglomeratic sandstone that weathers to a tan or reddish-brown. Its thickness varies from very thin or absent where deposited over prominent paleotopographic highs, as much as to 90 m (300 ft) high. Typically, fine sandstone becomes common towards the top in its upper 12 to 15 m (39 to 49 ft), which is part of a transition zone between it and the overlying Bright Angel Shale. The basal part of the Tapeats Sandstone is locally conglomeratic with beds of mudstone. Except where it overlies the Sixtymile Formation, the base of the Tapeats Sandstone is an unconformity underlying Precambrian rocks and is known as the Great Unconformity. In the eastern Grand Canyon, the Tapeats Sandstone uncomfortably overlies a hilly and weathered paleosurface underlain by the Grand Canyon Group and, in one structural basin, the Cambrian Sixtymile Formation. In the western Grand Canyon, the Tapeats Sandstone uncomfortably overlies a hilly and weathered paleosurface underlain by the Vishnu Basement Rocks The Tapeats Sandstone contains abundant invertebrate burrows and trails. But, body fossils, such as the fossils of brachiopods and trilobites are absent, except where it interfingers with the overlying Bright Angel Shale.

The Bright Angel Shale consists of green and red-brown, micaceous, thin-bedded shale, siltstone, and sandstone that weathers to a slope of the same colors. It is mostly composed of fissile shale (mudstone) and siltstone with some thicker beds of brown to tan sandstones and dolostones all of which are sometimes divided into numerous members. The Bright Angel Shale is about 57 to 150 m (187 to 492 ft) thick. The thin-bedded shales and sandstones are often interbedded in cm-scale cycles. Sedimentary structures are abundant in the Bright Angel Shale and include current, oscillation, and interference ripples. The Bright Angel Shale has a complex gradational and interfingering relationship with the overlying Muav Limestone and underlying Tapeats Sandstone. The Bright Angel Shale is the most fossiliferous of the formations of the Tonto Group. It has yielded majority of the body fossils known from the Tonto Group and is particularly rich in ichnofossils. As a whole, trilobite and other body fossils are fragmentary and rare in Bright Angel Shale. However, individual fossil quarries in the Bright Angel Shale, when excavated, are just as productive as many other Cambrian formations in the Great Basin and Rocky Mountain regions. Finally, possible bryophyte-grade cryptospores have been recovered from the Bright Angel Shale.

The Muav Limestone consists of thin-bedded, gray, medium to fine-grained, mottled dolomite; coarse- to medium-grained, grayish-white, sandy dolomite; and fine-grained limestone. It also contains thin beds of shale and siltstone, and conglomerate. The Muav Limestone weathers to a dark gray or rusty-orange color and forms cliffs or small ledges. This formation varies between 45 and 254 m (148 and 833 ft) in thickness. Its upper contact is a disconformity with the overlying Frenchman Mountain Dolostone. In the Muav Limestone, body fossils are infrequent and often poorly preserved. They include sponges, brachiopods, hyoliths, helcionelloids, trilobites, eocrinoids, and enigmatic invertebrates (Chancelloria, Scenella). Trilobites found in the Muav Limestone are of the same age as trilobites found in the Bright Angel Shale of eastern Grand canyon region, so it is likely not substantially younger. The trace fossils are common in the Muav Limestone and less abundant than the underlyingright Angel Shale. These trace fossils consist of invertebrate burrows and trails and Girvanella-like structures (oncolites).

The Frenchman Mountain Dolostone consists of white to dark gray, thin- to medium-bedded dolomite, which is separated by the underlying Muav Limestone by a disconformity throughout the Grand Canyon region. Its lower part contains shale partings that separate individual dolomite beds. The Frenchman Mountain Dolostone forms a series of ledges, cliffs, and slopes. Its thickness varies from 60 to 140 m (200 to 460 ft). The only known fossils reported from the Frenchman Mountain Dolostone are invertebrate burrows and trails.

== Tonto Platform ==
The Tonto Platform is a very prominent, wide bench that occurs near the bottom of the eastern Grand Canyon. The gentle slopes of the Tonto Platform were created by rapid backwearing of the Bright Angle Shale. Along its lower edge, the erosion resistant Tapeats Sandstone forms a cliff that marks the outer boundary of the Inner Gorge and the lower boundary of the Outer Canyon. Forming the upper edge of the Tonto Platform are alternating cliffs and steep slopes formed by Cambrian limestones and dolomites. The Tonto Trail is a mostly horizontal trail on the south side of Granite Gorge that lies upon the Tonto Platform.

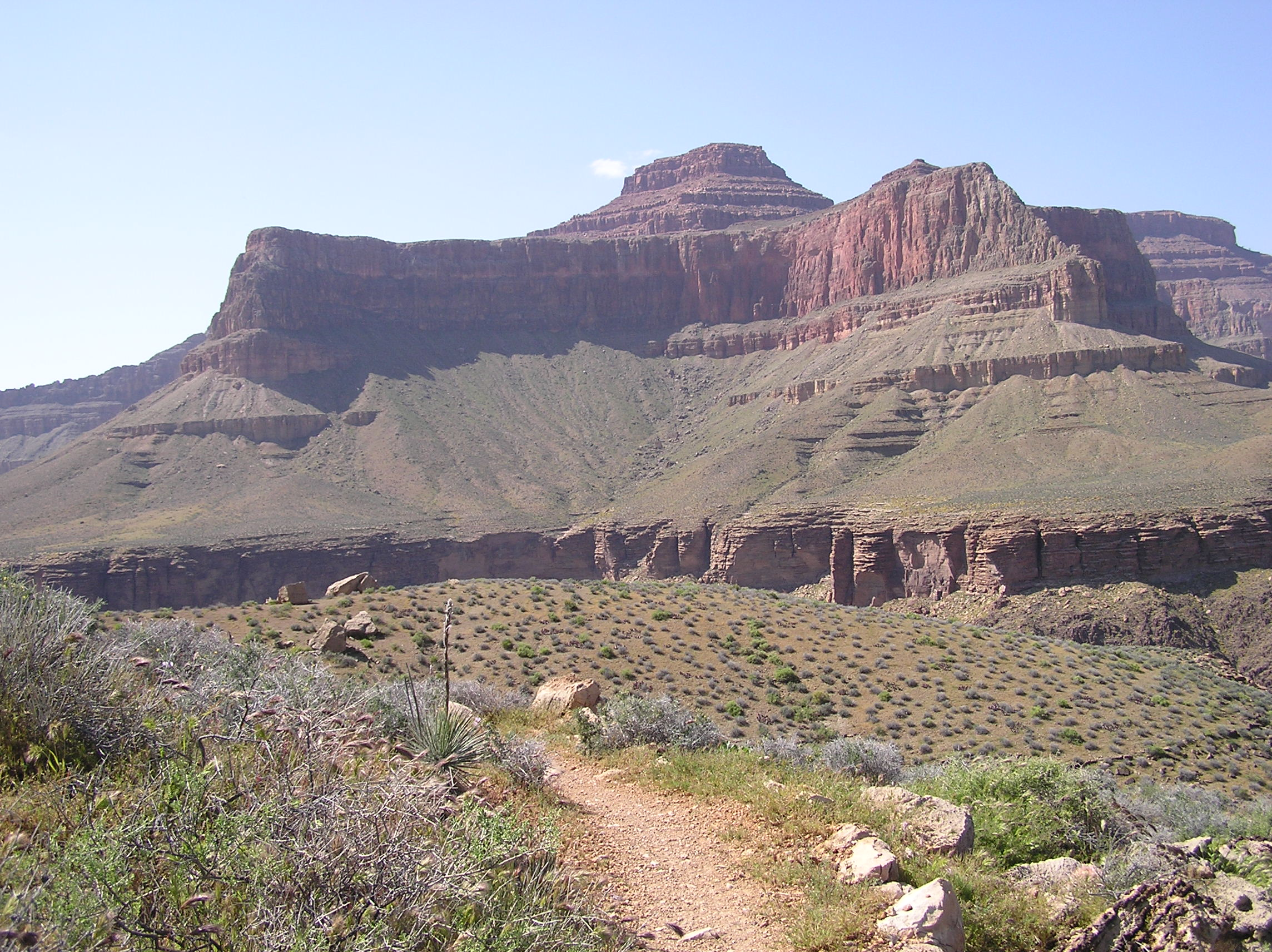
View of Tower of Set peak and sub-unit cliff section from Tonto Trail, Granite Gorge, north of Mohave Point, Grand Canyon Village, South Rim.
The peak is behind and separated from a cliff unit (with small prominence), in front-(photo center, right, Tower of Set (peak) to its left).
Vertical erosion in cliff of Redwall Limestone, upon horizontal Muav Limestone cliff. The Tapeats Sandstone sits in foreground on Granite Gorge, and is seen as thinly-bedded. The slope-former above is the (dull-greenish)-Bright Angel Shale with thin, inter-bedding, as well as one resistant cliff unit. The Redwall Limestone cliff section in Grand Canyon is about 450 feet (137 m) thick.

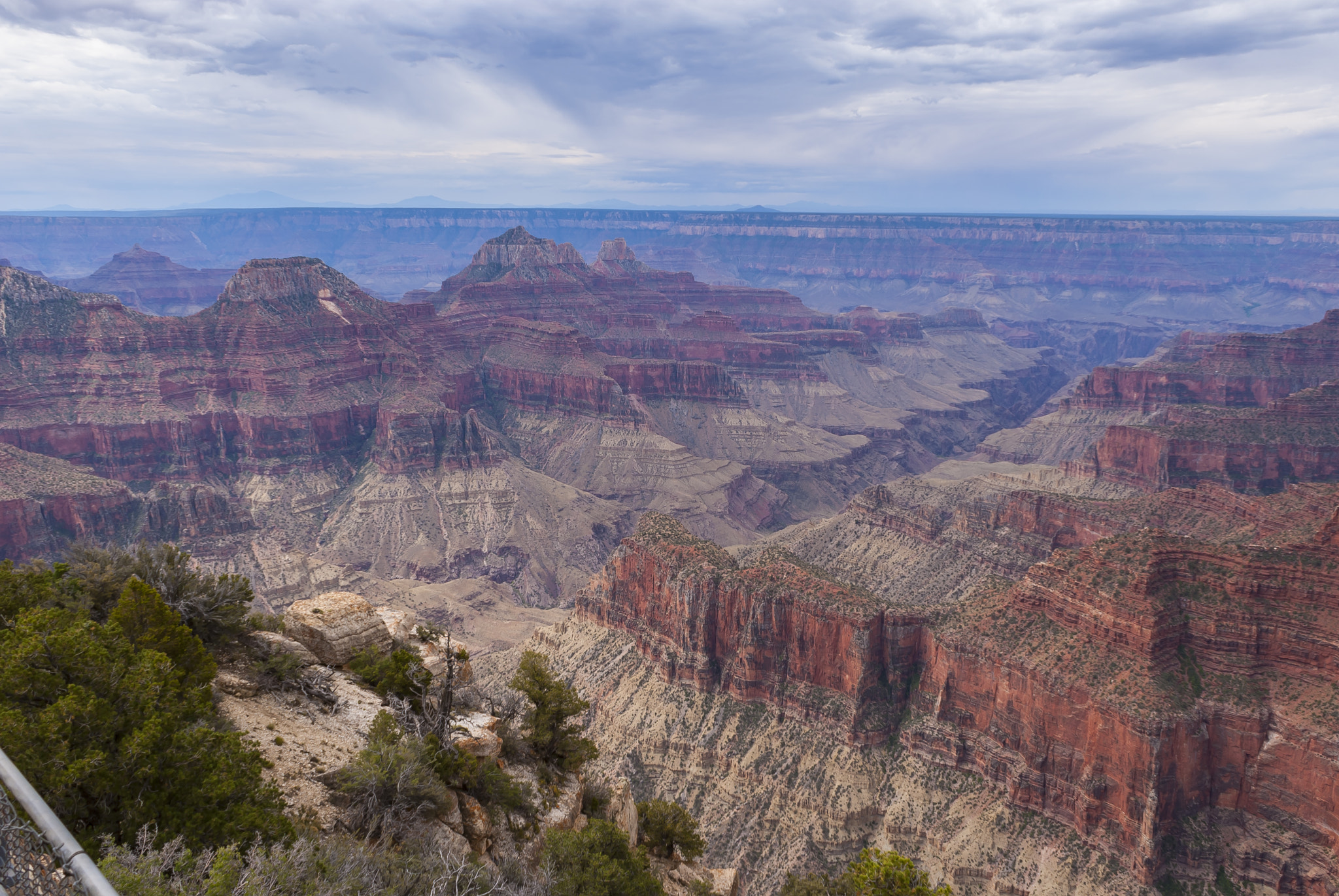
close-up and far views of the Tonto Group formations.
Note in far view the cliff-run of the Tapeats Sandstone cliff below the (whitish)-greenish Bright Angel Shale-(often dull-greenish, but even yellowish in northeast Grand Canyon).

== See also ==
- Geology of the Grand Canyon area
- Great Unconformity
- Sauk sequence
