= Bright Angel Shale =

Cambrian geologic formation found in the Southwestern United States

- Stratigraphic range: Middle Cambrian; 507–502 Ma
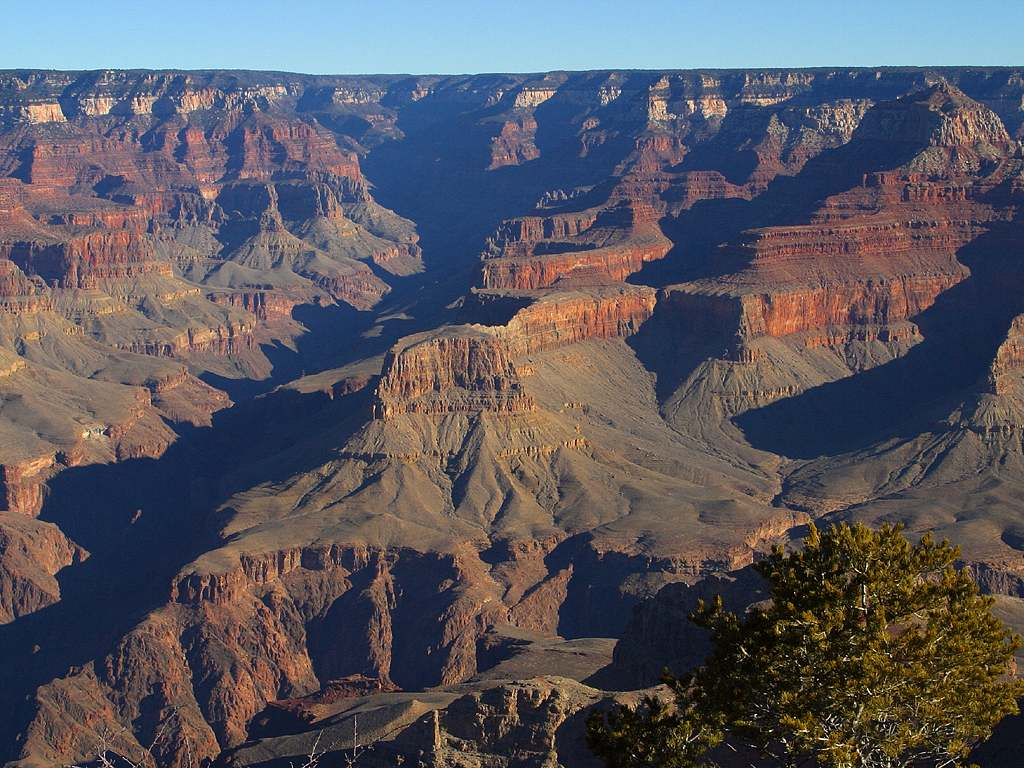
- Muav Limestone – (dark or light gray, brown, or orange-red subcliff at base of Redwall Limestone cliff) and Bright Angel Shale (greenish slope-former), resting on Tapeats Sandstone (short, dp brown vertical cliff) (Tapeats forms the "Tonto Platform"), inner canyon, Granite Gorge. (The 3 units – Muav, Bright Angel, and Tapeats, are easily seen below the red-stained Redwall Limestone (220 m (720 ft) thick)
- Type: Geological formation
- Unit of: Tonto Group
- Underlies: Muav Limestone
- Overlies: Tapeats Sandstone
- Thickness: 67 m (220 ft) at its maximum

Lithology
- Primary: micaceous siltstone and shale
- Other: sandstone and glauconitic sandstone

Location
- Region: northern Arizona, southeast California, southern Nevada, and southcentral Utah
- Country: United States of America

Type section
- Named for: Bright Angel Canyon, Bright Angel quadrangle, Coconino Co., Arizona
- Named by: Noble (1914)

The Bright Angel Shale is one of five geological formations that comprise the Cambrian Tonto Group. It and the other formations of the Tonto Group outcrop in the Grand Canyon, Arizona, and parts of northern Arizona, central Arizona, southeast California, southern Nevada, and southeast Utah. The Bright Angel Shale consists of locally fossiliferous, green and red-brown, micaceous, fissile shale (mudstone) and siltstone with local, thicker beds of brown to tan sandstone and limestone. It ranges in thickness from 57 to 450 ft (17 to 137 m). Typically, its thin-bedded shales and sandstones are interbedded in cm-scale cycles. They also exhibit abundant sedimentary structures that include current, oscillation, and interference ripples. The Bright Angel Shale also gradually grades downward into the underlying Tapeats Sandstone. It also complexly interfingers with the overlying Muav Limestone. These characters make the upper and lower contacts of the Bright Angel Shale often difficult to define. Typically, its thin-bedded shales and sandstones erode into green and red-brown slopes that rise from the Tonto Platform up to cliffs formed by limestones of the overlying Muav Limestone and dolomites of the Frenchman Mountain Dolostone.

== Nomenclature ==
In 1875, G. K. Gilbert recognized that strata exposed near the bottom of parts of the Grand Canyon are similar to those known elsewhere in Arizona as the Tonto Group. Based upon this similarity, he assigned the strata that form the lowermost part of the Phanerozoic strata in the Grand Canyon to the Tonto Group. Without designating formal type localities, he also subdivided the Tonto Group into three subdivisions, from youngest to oldest, the Marbled limestone, the Tonto shale, and the Tonto sandstone.

In 1914, L F. Noble renamed Gilbert's subdivisions of the Tonto Group. He renamed the Tonto sandstone as the Tapeats Sandstone and the Tonto shale as the Bright Angel Shale. He named the Bright Angel Shale after Bright Angel Canyon because in the walls of this canyon, this formation is well exposed.

Later in 1922, the Marbled limestone was redefined and renamed as the Muav Limestone by L. F. Noble. According to Noble's definition, the Muav Limestone consisted of an upper set of dolomite beds and a lower set of limestone beds. Noble's lower set of limestone beds is now defined as the Muav Limestone and the Frenchman Mountain Dolostone is now defined as Noble's upper set of dolomite beds.

E. D. McKee and C. E. Resser largely retained Noble's nomenclature. However, they did subdivide the Bright Angel Shale into a number of subdivisions, members, based upon prominent beds of limestone and sandstone within it. However, these members have found to be confusing and unhelpful in understanding the stratigraphy of the Bright Angel Shale and are typically ignored and rarely used in the published literature.

== Description ==
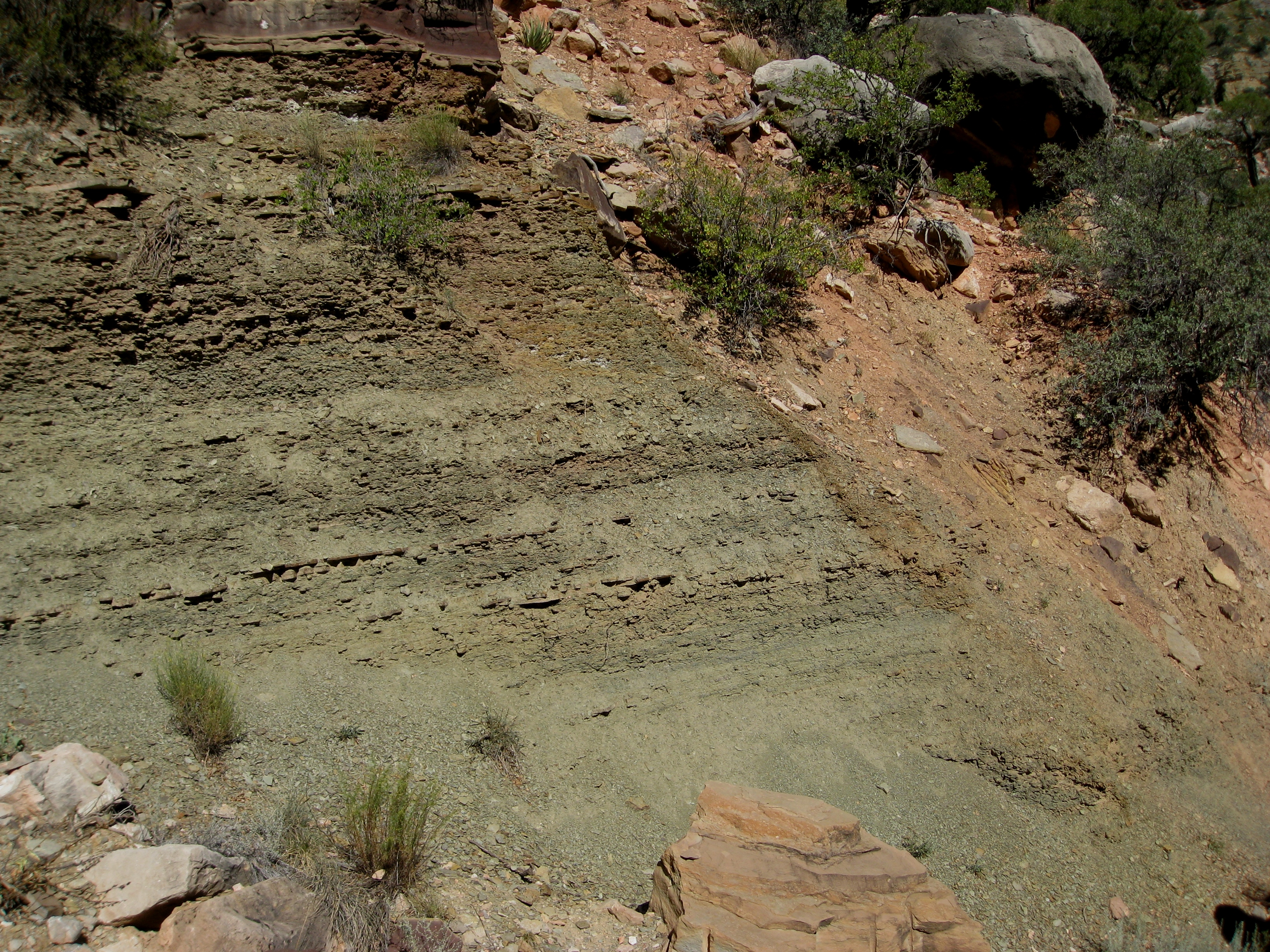
The Bright Angel Shale exposed on canyon wall beneath Kaibab Lodge on North Rim. Image courtesy of Grand Canyon National Park

In the Grand Canyon, the Bright Angel Shale is typically a heterogenous, sometimes fossiliferous, mixture of interbedded shale, mudstone, siltstone, fine-grained sandstone, and isolated beds of limestone. The dominant lithology within the Bright Angel Shale is greenish shale that is composed largely of illite and varying amounts of chlorite and kaolinite. A reddish brown coloration is imparted to a number of the sandstone and siltstone beds by the high percentage of hematitic ooids and iron oxide cements that they contain. Isolated beds of coarse-grained sandstone with either basal conglomerate or conglomeratic sandstone also locally occur within the Bright Angel Shale. The gravel fraction of these beds contain quartz, minor amounts of potassium feldspars, sedimentary rock fragments, and glauconite. Glauconite also occurs in and imparts a greenish color to many of the siltstones and sandstones. Towards its base, the Bright Angel Shale becomes increasingly coarser with increasing frequency of sandstone beds until it grades gradually into the Tapeats Sandstone.

The siltstones and sandstones of the Bright Angel Shale exhibit sedimentary structures throughout the Grand Canyon. These sedimentary structures include horizontal laminations, small- to large-scale planar tabular and trough cross-stratification, and wavy and lenticular bedding. The isolated coarse-grained and conglomeratic sandstones are typically structureless and crudely stratified and overlie a locally scoured surface.

In the Grand Canyon, the Bright Angel Shale is generally about 110 to 150 m (360 to 490 ft) thick. In the western Grand Canyon, the Bright Angel Shale is over 140 m (460 ft) thick and decrease eastward in thickness to only about 82 m (269 ft) at Toroweap in the central canyon. It is 100 m (330 ft) thick in Bright Angel Canyon. The complex interfingering of the Bright Angel Shale with the overlying Muav Limestone is the main cause of the variability in its thickness. South the Grand Canyon, decreases in thickness only a few feet thick in the Juniper Mountains north of Prescott, Arizona.

== Fossils ==
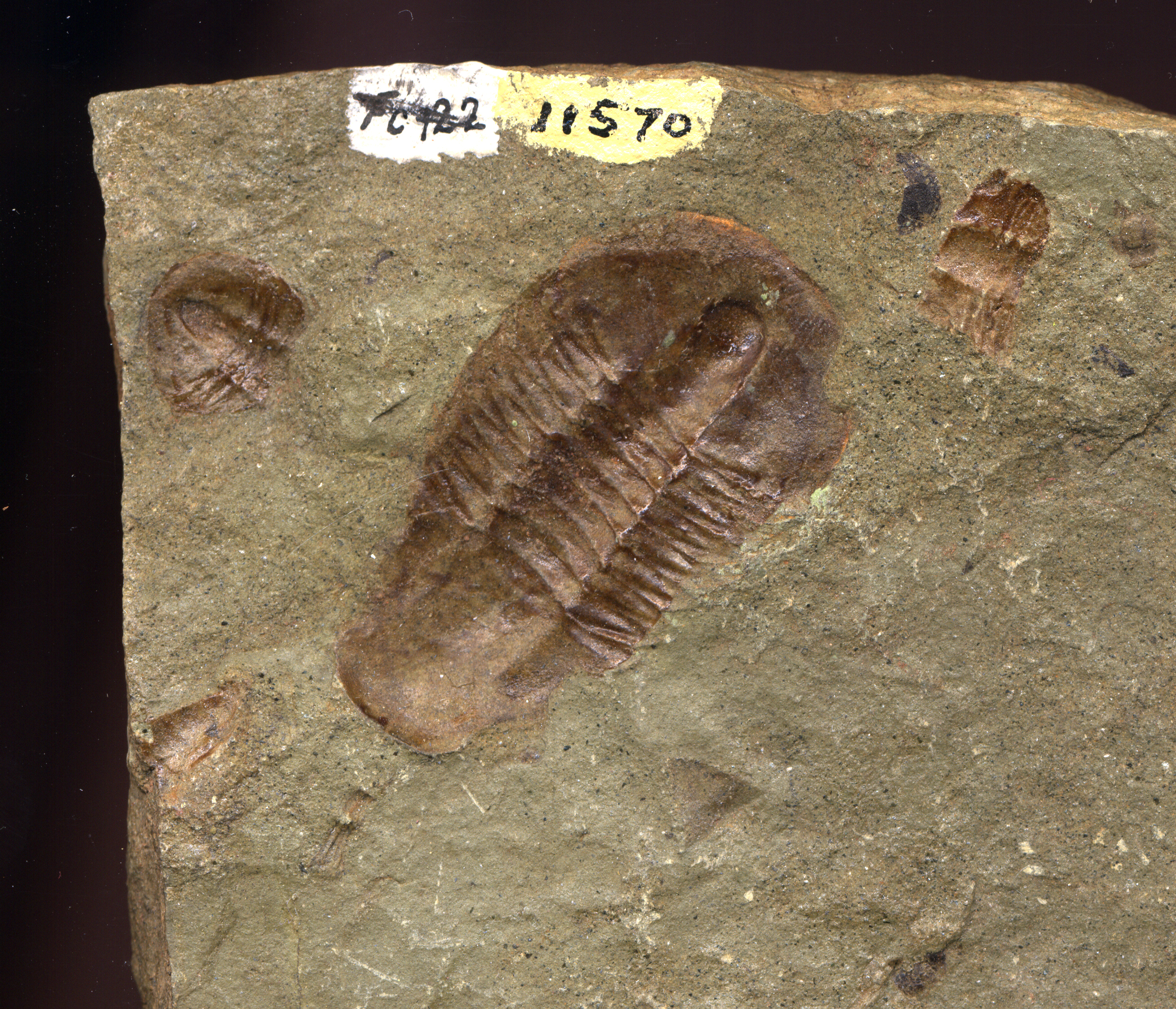
Fossil trilobites from Bright Angel Shale. Image courtesy of Grand Canyon National Park

Within the Grand Canyon, the Bright Angel Shale is the most fossiliferous of the five formations that comprise the Tonto Group. It contains a variety of body fossils and is rich in trace fossils. Overall, when compared with other Middle Cambrian formations in the region, the Bright Angel Shale body fossils are fragmentary and rare. Although it is relatively barren regionally of body fossils, individual beds can be rich in complete body fossils. Individual beds within the Bright Angel Shale are as productive as many of the other Cambrian formations in the Great Basin and Rocky Mountain regions. The Bright Angel Shale has yielded at least 15 species of trilobites and four genera of brachiopods. In addition, one genus of hyoliths, four genera of possible marine arthropods, and two species of eocrinoids have been found in it.

The trace fossils found in the Bright Angel Shale consist of arthropod tracks and trails, worm burrows, and dwelling structures. Some of these have been identified at the ichnogenus and ichnospecies level. In addition, wrinkle structures have been found within the Bright Angel Shale in the Sumner Butte area. They are classified as microbially induced sedimentary structures.

In addition to the above permineralized body fossils of metazoans, the fossils of non-biomineralized, organic-walled micro-to mesofossils, known as small carbonaceous fossils have been found in the Bright Angel Shale. These fossils were extracted from samples of finely laminated, fissile, and moderately micaceous green-gray shale from the lower to middle Bright Angel Shale using hydroflouric acid. These small carbonaceous fossils consists of the remains of probable algae, cyanobacteria, crustaceans, molluscs, and priapulids (named Kraytdraco) with complex filament-bearing teeth.

== Depositional setting ==
Initially, the Bright Angel Shale, largely on the presence of glauconite, was regarded to have accumulated within the deeper part of a marine shelf. Later, the Bright Angel Shale is typically interpreted as a shallow marine shelf unit and its various members are interpreted to be to minor transgressions and regressions. However, parts of it have also been more recently interpreted as including estuary and tidal flat settings influenced by storm events. This interpretation is based on the type of cross-bedding in sandstones and presence of wavy or lenticular heterolithic bedding, both of which indicate a changing tidal environment. Finally, the lack of acritarchs in the shales, the dominant lithology of the formation is regarded as evidence for minimal marine influence during their deposition. Isolated shale beds within the Bright Angel Shale that contain a well preserved and diverse fauna of trilobites, brachiopods and others fossils likely represent periods of shallow marine shelf deposition during periods of high, relative sea levels in the Grand Canyon region.

== Age ==
In 1945, E. D. McKee and C. E. Resser used trilobite fossil assemblages to determine age of the Bright Angel Shale. They interpreted the trilobite biostratigraphy to indicate that it crosses time lines and becomes younger toward the east. In their interpretation, the base of the Bright Angel Shale and its lower third of it is late Early Cambrian whereas in the eastern part of the canyon its base and entire thickness is Middle Cambrian. In 2018, K. Karlstrom and others found that the Tapeats Sandstone is younger than previously interpreted and does not get younger to the east. As a result, the Bright Angel Shale lies entirely in the Middle Cambrian.

Bright Angel Shale sites

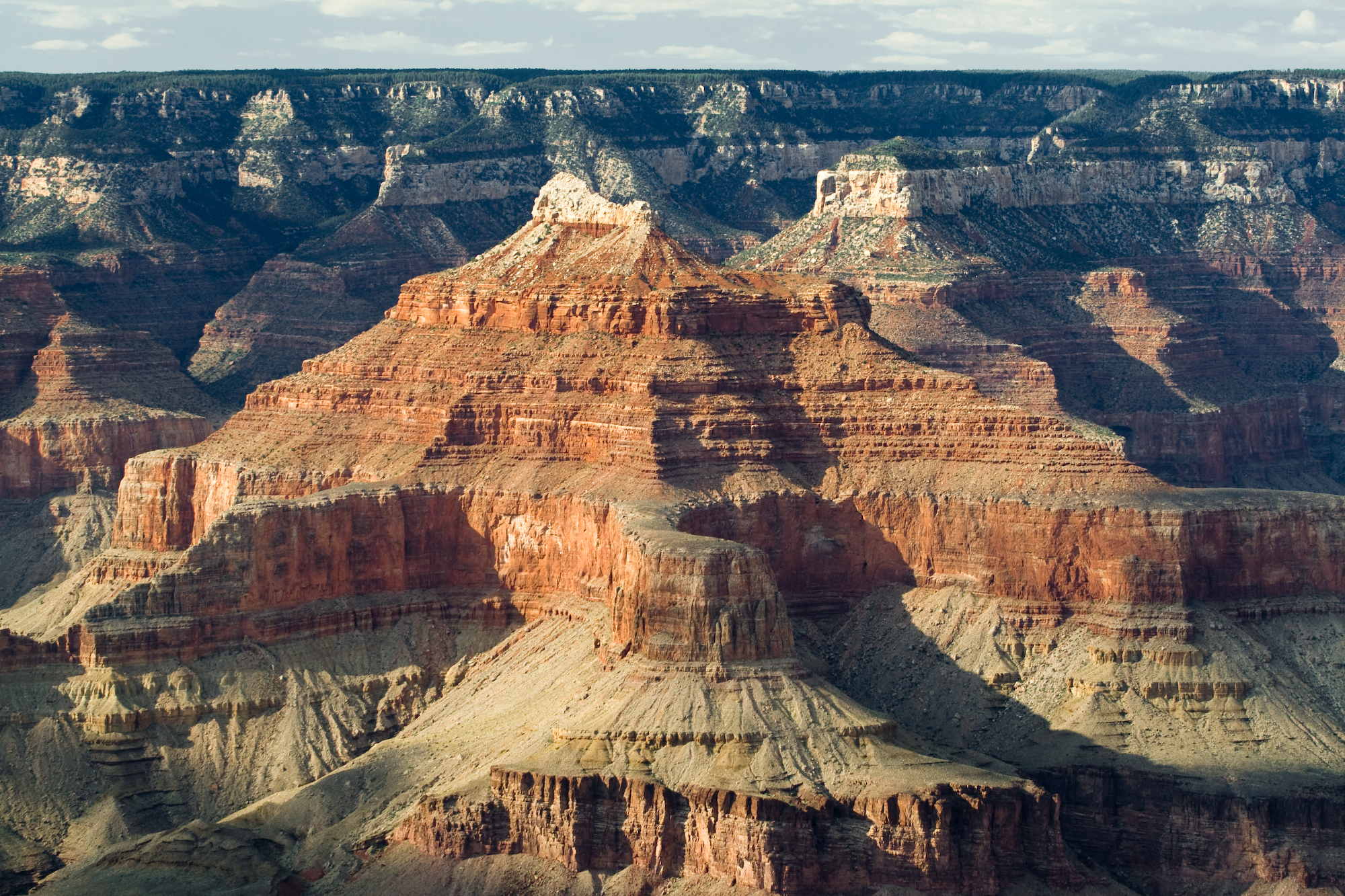
Relative long distance photo of Isis Temple (adjacent prominence is Tiyo Point, of the North Rim)

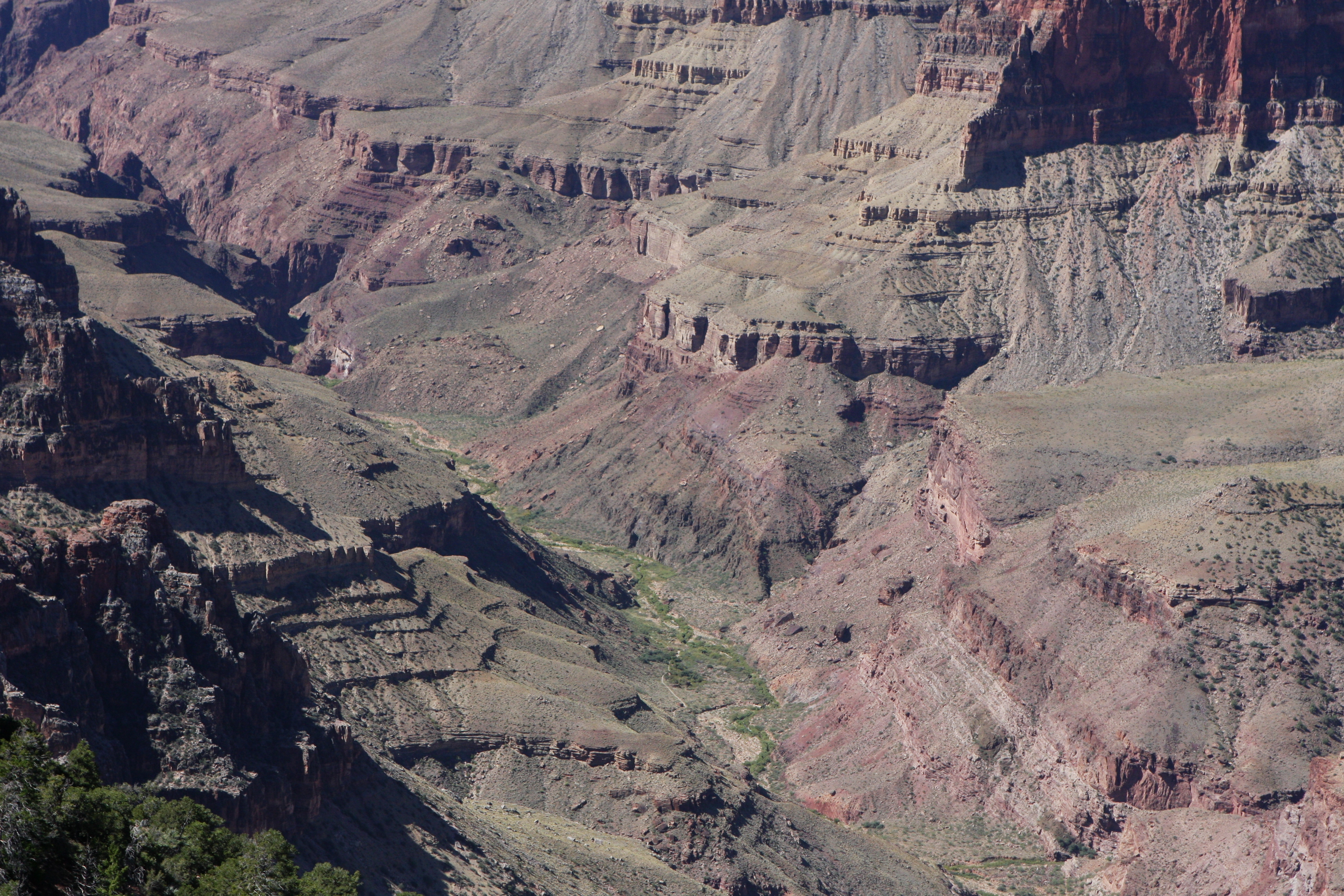
The entire Tonto Group 3-unit sequence is visible above the Colorado River (side intersecting canyon to Granite Gorge)

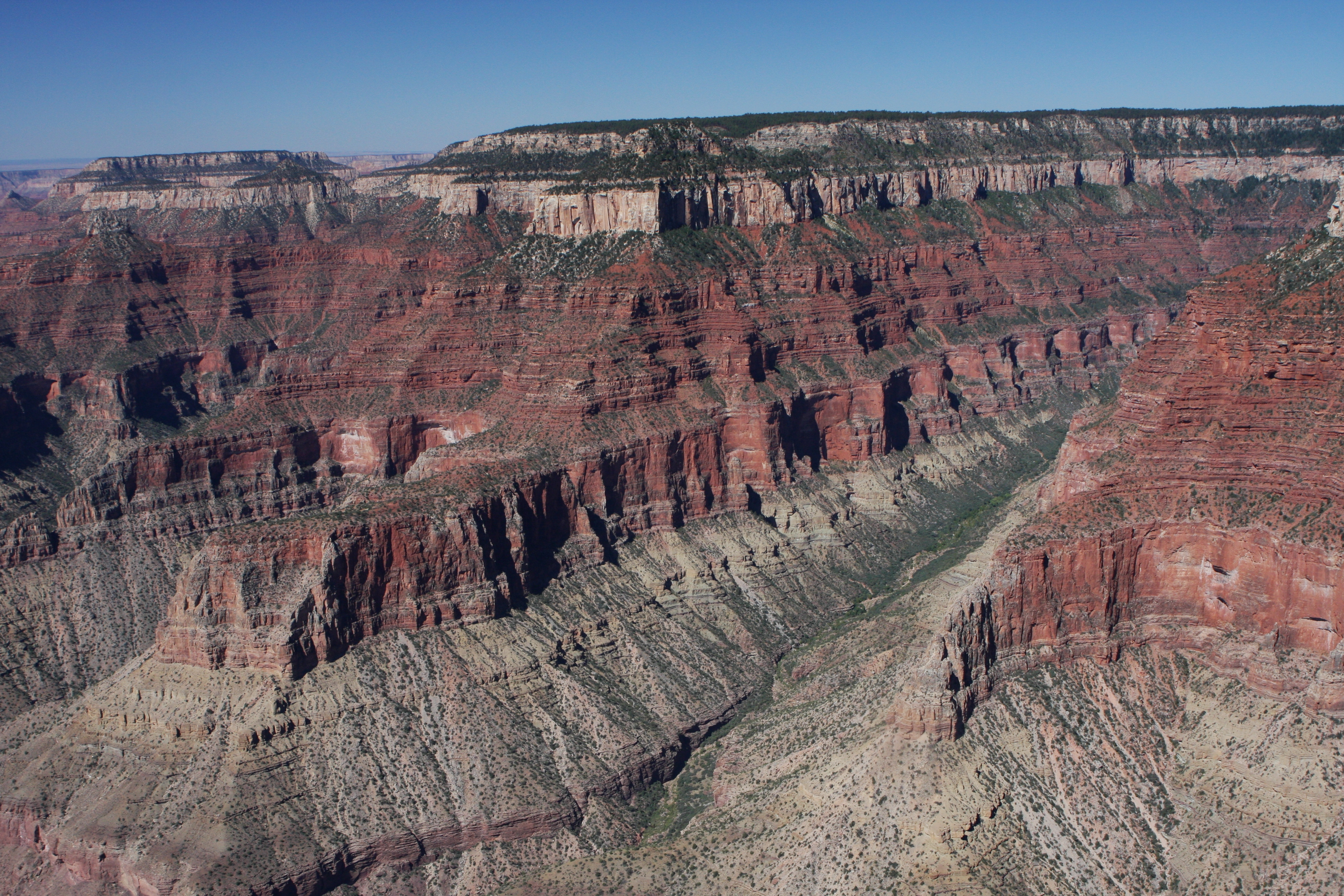
(From Komo Point)-Sloping Supai Group redbeds upon Redwall Limestone cliffs and horizontal platforms on the Muav Limestone on (white)-greenish (slopes) of Bright Angel Shale

The units of the Tonto Group and the colorful Bright Angel Shale are easily identified as a geological sequence beneath the tall cliffs of the Redwall Limestone (the Redwall sits upon a short resistant cliff of Muav Limestone); the Tonto Group is also easily seen beside Granite Gorge of the Colorado River and the Vishnu Basement Rocks

== See also ==
- Geology of the Grand Canyon area
- List of fossiliferous stratigraphic units in Arizona
- Paleontology in Arizona
