= Muav Limestone =

Cambrian geologic formation found in the Southwestern United States

- Stratigraphic range: Middle Cambrian; 502–499 Ma
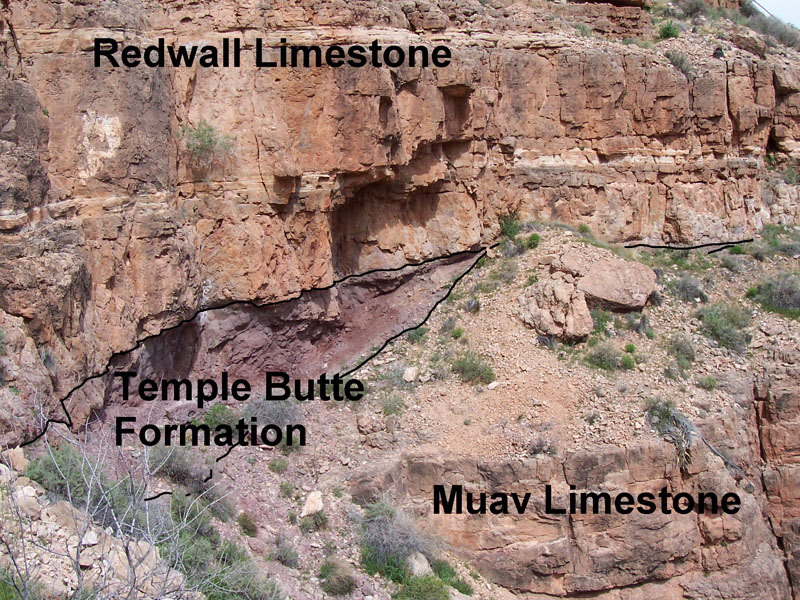
- representative sequence of Redwall Limestone, Temple Butte Formation, and Muav Limestone, in Grand Canyon
- Type: Geological formation
- Unit of: Tonto Group
- Underlies: either the Frenchman Mountain Dolostone (Cambrian) or Redwall Limestone (Mississippian). Locally underlies Temple Butte Formation (Devonian) that fills narrow paleovalleys cut into the Muav Limestone.
- Overlies: Bright Angel Shale
- Thickness: 250 m (820 ft), at maximum

Lithology
- Primary: limestone and dolomite
- Other: shale and intraformational conglomerate.

Location
- Region: Northern Arizona (Grand Canyon), central Arizona, southeast California, southern Nevada, and southeast Utah
- Country: United States of America

Type section
- Named for: Muav Canyon, north side of Colorado RiverFrenchman Mountain Dolostone

The Muav Limestone is a Cambrian geologic formation within the 5-member Tonto Group. It is a thin-bedded, gray, medium to fine-grained, mottled dolomite; coarse- to medium-grained, grayish-white, sandy dolomite and grayish-white, mottled, fine-grained limestone. It also contains beds of shale and intraformational conglomerate. The beds of the Muav Limestone are either structureless or exhibit horizontally laminations and cross-stratification. The Muav Limestone forms cliffs or small ledges that weather a dark gray or rusty-orange color. These cliffs or small ledges directly overlie the sloping surfaces of the Bright Angel Shale. The thickness of this formation decreases eastward from 76 m (249 ft) in the western Grand Canyon to 14 m (46 ft) in the eastern Grand Canyon. To the west in southern Nevada, its thickness increases to 250 m (820 ft) in the Frenchman Mountain region.

Beyond the Grand Canyon area, the Muav Limestone is recognized in southern Utah, southern Nevada and southern California. In parts of California, it is known and mapped as the Muav Marble.

== Nomenclature ==
In 1875, G. K. Gilbert mapped the Tonto Group within the lower part of the Grand Canyon. At that time, Gilbert subdivided it, from oldest to youngest, into the Tonto Group into the Tonto sandstone, Tonto sandstone, and Marbled limestone.

In 1914, L F. Noble renamed Gilbert's three subdivisions of the Tonto Group. Noble renamed Tonto sandstone as the Tapeats Sandstone, the Tonto shale as the Bright Angel Shale, and the Marbled limestone as the Muav Limestone. As defined by Noble in 1914, his Muav Limestone consisted of ...the predominantly calcareous part of the Tonto group. Lying between the underlying Bright Angel Shale and either discontinuous lenses of overlying Devonian beds or the base of the Redwall Limestone.

In 1922, L F. Noble subdivided the Muav Limestone into four informal subdivisions. From top to bottom, his subdivisions are subdivision A, bluff massive dolomite; subdivision B, gray cross-bedded sandstone; subdivision C, thin-bedded mottled limestone; and subdivision D, basal thin-bedded mottle limestone.

Later in 1945, E. D. McKee and C. E. Resser removed subdivision A of L F. Noble from both the Muav Limestone, and the Tonto Group and assigned it to an informal geologic unit called the Cambrian undifferentiated dolomites. This created an informal geologic unit that is composed entirely of dolomite overlying the Muav Limestone, that is composed largely of limestone. Finally, S. M. Rowland and others formally named the Cambrian undifferentiated dolomites as the Frenchman Mountain Dolostone and restored it to the Tonto Group.

== Contacts ==
The Muav is in part younger than, and in-part grades into, the underlying Bright Angel Shale. To the west, the underlying Bright Angel Shale interfingers complexly with the overlying Muav Limestone. Its upper contact with the overlying Frenchman Mountain Dolostone is a well-defined disconformity. The Muav Limestone is overlain in the western Grand Canyon by the Cambrian Frenchman Mountain Dolostone. Eastward, the Frenchman Mountain Dolostone pinches out and the Mississippian Redwall Limestone, which forms prominent vertical cliffs, directly lies upon the Muav Limestone. Discontinuous lenses of Devonian Temple Butte Formation fill deep paleovalleys that have been cut into and occasionally through the Frenchman Mountain Dolostone and into the Muav Limestone.

== Fossils ==
The body fossils of invertebrates found in the Muav Limestone are infrequent and often poorly preserved. They include sponges, brachiopods, hyoliths, helcionelloids, trilobites, eocrinoids, and enigmatic invertebrates. The types of body fossils reported from the Muav Limestone are not as diverse as those reported from the Bright Angel Shale. The invertebrate body fossils are dominated by ptychopariid and corynexochid trilobites. The Muav Limestone is likely not substantially younger than the Bright Angel Shale, as it contains trilobites of the same age as trilobites found in the Bright Angel Shale of eastern Grand Canyon region. In addition, to trilobites, the Muav Limestone contains enigmatic body fossils such as hyoliths; the single-shelled, mollusk Helcionella; Scenella hermitensis; and Chancelloria.

Drumian trilobites have been found in the uppermost Muav Formation and basal few meters of the Frenchman Mountain Dolostone. This trilobite fauna consists of Glyphaspis tetonensis, Crepicephalus? upis, Solenopleurella? quadrata, and Modocia sp. These trilobites are all associated with the Bolaspidella Zone.

Although trace fossils are common in the Muav Limestone, they are less abundant than those found in the underlying Bright Angel Shale. They consist of invertebrate burrows and trails and Girvanella-like structures (oncolites). Pervasive bioturbation of the calcareous sediment is responsible for the mottled appearance of most of the Muav Limestone.

== Depositional Environment ==
It is currently accepted that the Muav Limestone accumulated in an offshore marine environment during a series of at least five transgressive and regressive events. These events are reflected the in five members into which the Muav Limestone has been subdivided and the step-like pattern in which the Muav Limestone interfingers with the underlying Bright Angel Shale and diagonally crosses time planes. Presumably, these transgressions are the result of rapid, periodic, rises in relative sea level, interrupted by at least four drops in relative sea level that caused regressions of lesser extent. The interfingering of shales and sandstones of the Bright Angel Shale into the limestones of the Muav Limestone are the result of such transgressive and regressive events.

== Gallery – Muav Limestone ==
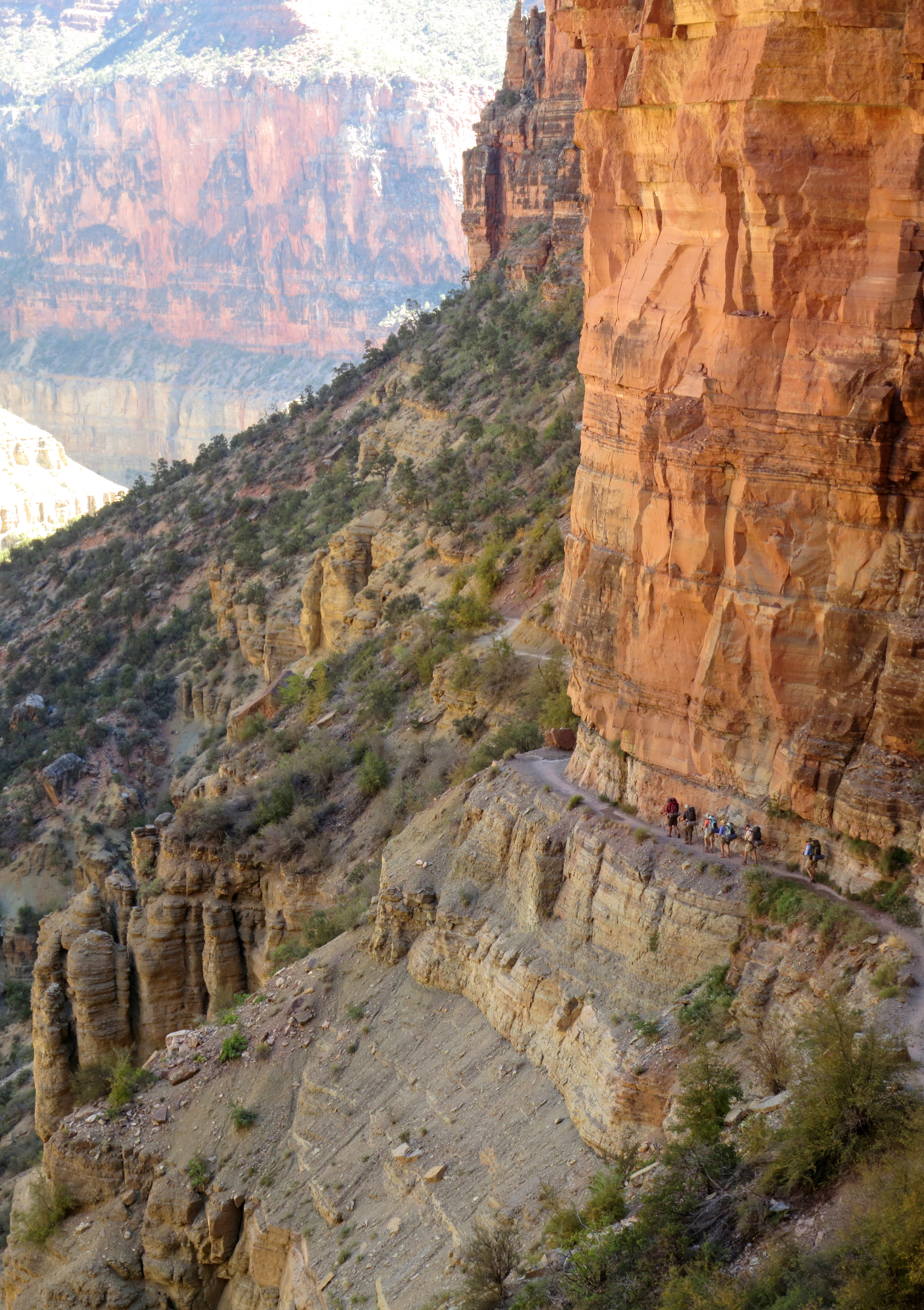
Muav Limestone cliff example, below Redwall Limestone cliff, on the North Kaibab Trail (closeup photos, often show purple erosion debris)(expandable photo)

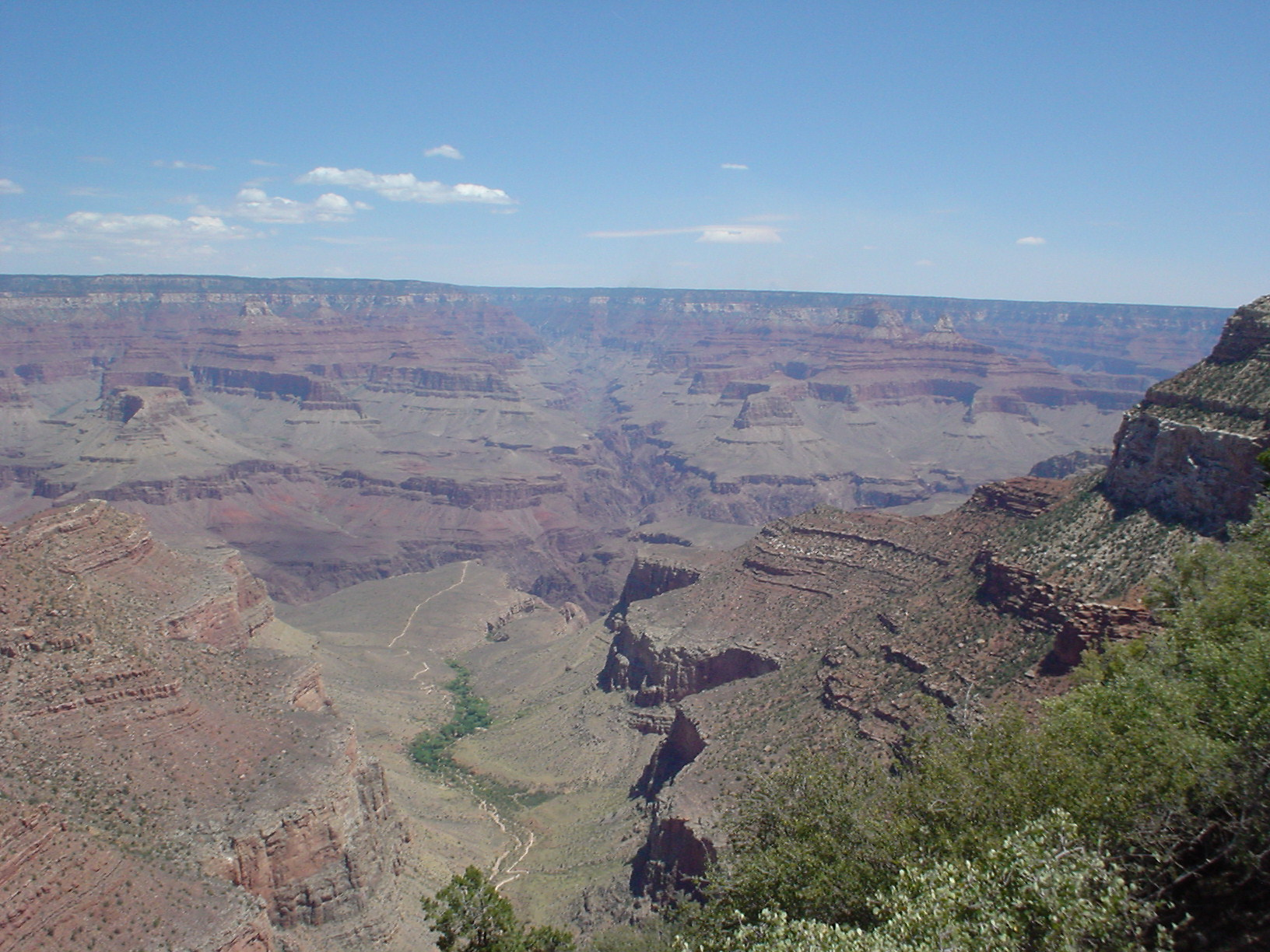
(view due-north, northeast, from Bright Angel Trail, (South Rim section) – View of south-draining Bright Angel Canyon, containing in its lowest section with the Tapeats Sandstone, upon the Granite Gorge, the cliffs of gray-brown Muav Limestone (25% at base of Redwall Limestone), laid upon the slope-forming & greenish Bright Angel Shale. (The trail also descends/ascends through units on the South Rim, at near photo view.)

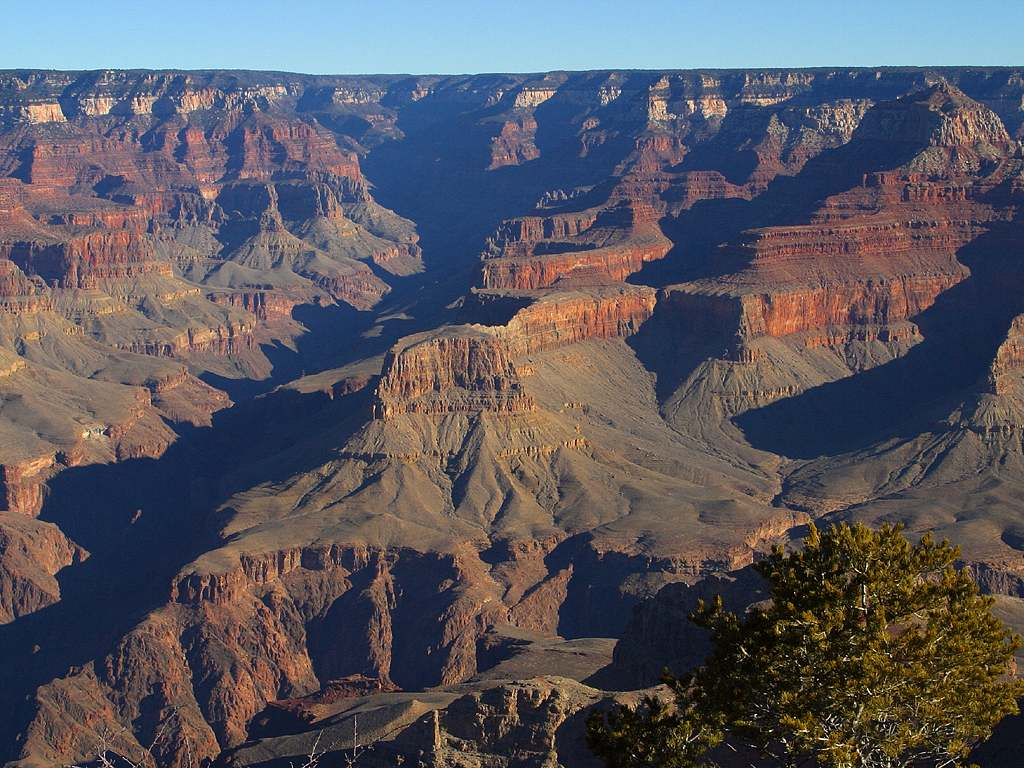
View to Sumner Butte, Redwall Limestone peak & vertical cliff, sitting on Muav Limestone

== See also ==
- Geology of the Grand Canyon area
