= Frenchman Mountain =

Mountain in Nevada, United States

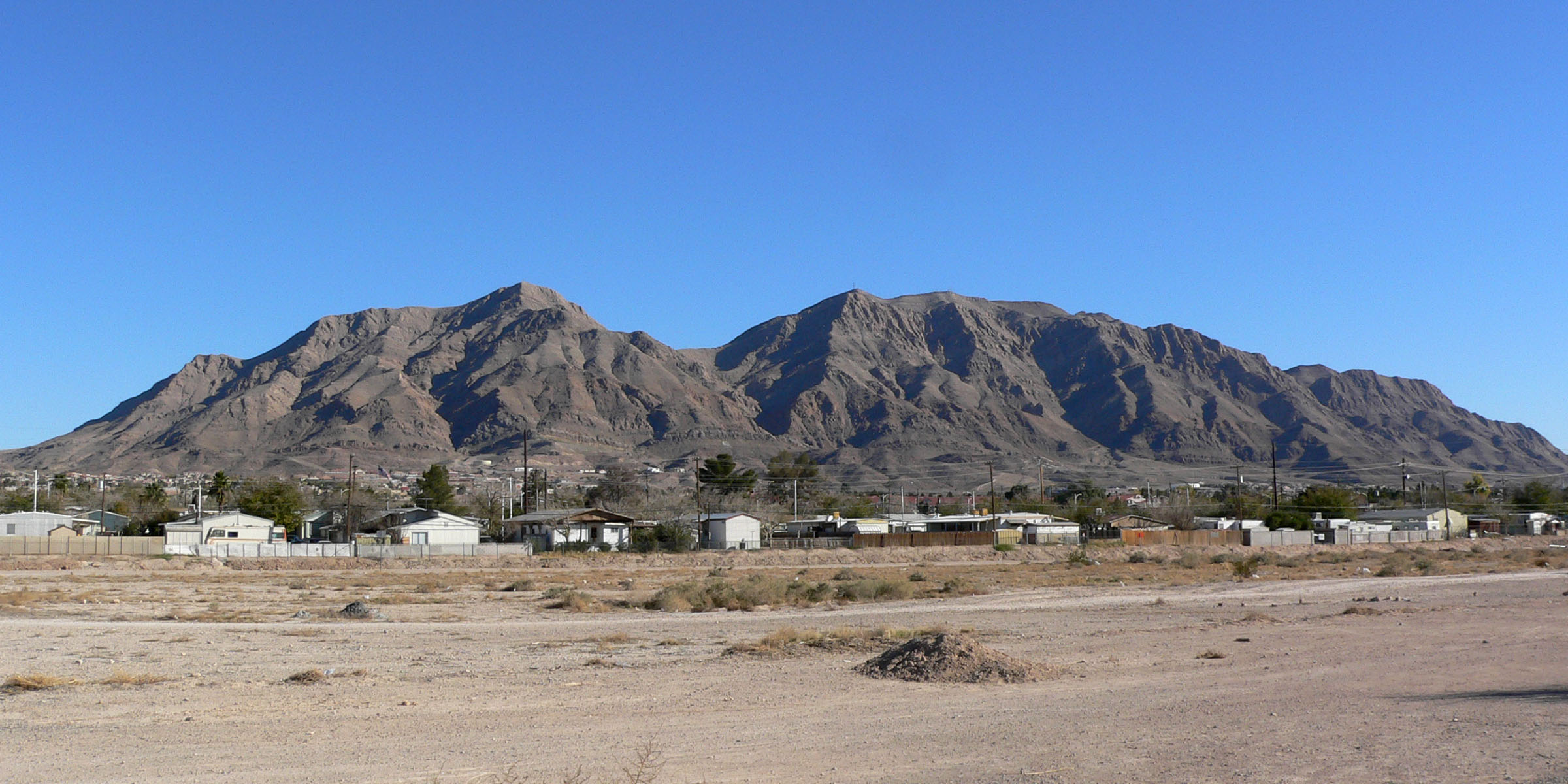
- Frenchman Mountain (west-facing slope) Frenchman Mountain, left (south-facing slope), Rainbow Gardens, right

Highest point
- Elevation: 4,056 ft (1,236 m) NAVD 88
- Prominence: 1,972 ft (601 m)
- Coordinates: 36°10′45″N 114°59′51″W

Geography
- Location within Nevada
- Location: Clark County, Nevada, U.S.
- Topo map(s): USGS Frenchman Mountain, NV

Frenchman Mountain is a mountain and highest peak located east of Las Vegas in Clark County, Nevada. It is the highest peak and one of only two mountains in the Frenchman Mountain Range, the other being Sunrise Mountain lies 3.6 miles (5.8 km) to the northeast adjacent to Nellis Air Force Base.

The peak lies on a north to north-northeast trending ridge about 2000 feet above the nearby valleys. The north end of the McCullough Range about 12 miles (19 km) to the south has a parallel trend. The River Mountains lie to the southeast. State Route 147 crosses its northern slope. A geologically rich area called Rainbow Gardens is located to its southeast, as is an igneous laccolith, Lava Butte. The Frenchman Mountain Fault poses a significant earthquake danger to the Clark County region.

Made up of rocks similar to those found on the bottom of the Grand Canyon, Frenchman Mountain formed when faulting elevated and tilted the rocks followed by erosion, giving it its sharp triangular profile. The mountain provides an example of the Great Unconformity with the tilted Paleozoic Tapeats Sandstone underlain by Paleoproterozoic Vishnu Schist, which is some of the oldest rock on the North American continent, having been created about two billion years ago.

It is likely named after the Frenchman Mine, which itself was alleged to be the site of a stock scam by a Belgian immigrant (mistakenly assumed to be French). It is often confused with Sunrise Mountain, the name of a smaller peak to the north of Frenchman Mountain, because the sun rises over it in some areas of Las Vegas. The area from Cheyenne Avenue and Boulder Highway and Lamb Boulevard is commonly known as Sunrise Manor Township CDP.

Local conservationists have proposed the area, along with Gypsum Cave and Sunrise Mountain, be protected as a national monument.
