= Redwall Limestone =

Geologic formation in Arizona, USA

- Stratigraphic range: Early and early Late Mississippian
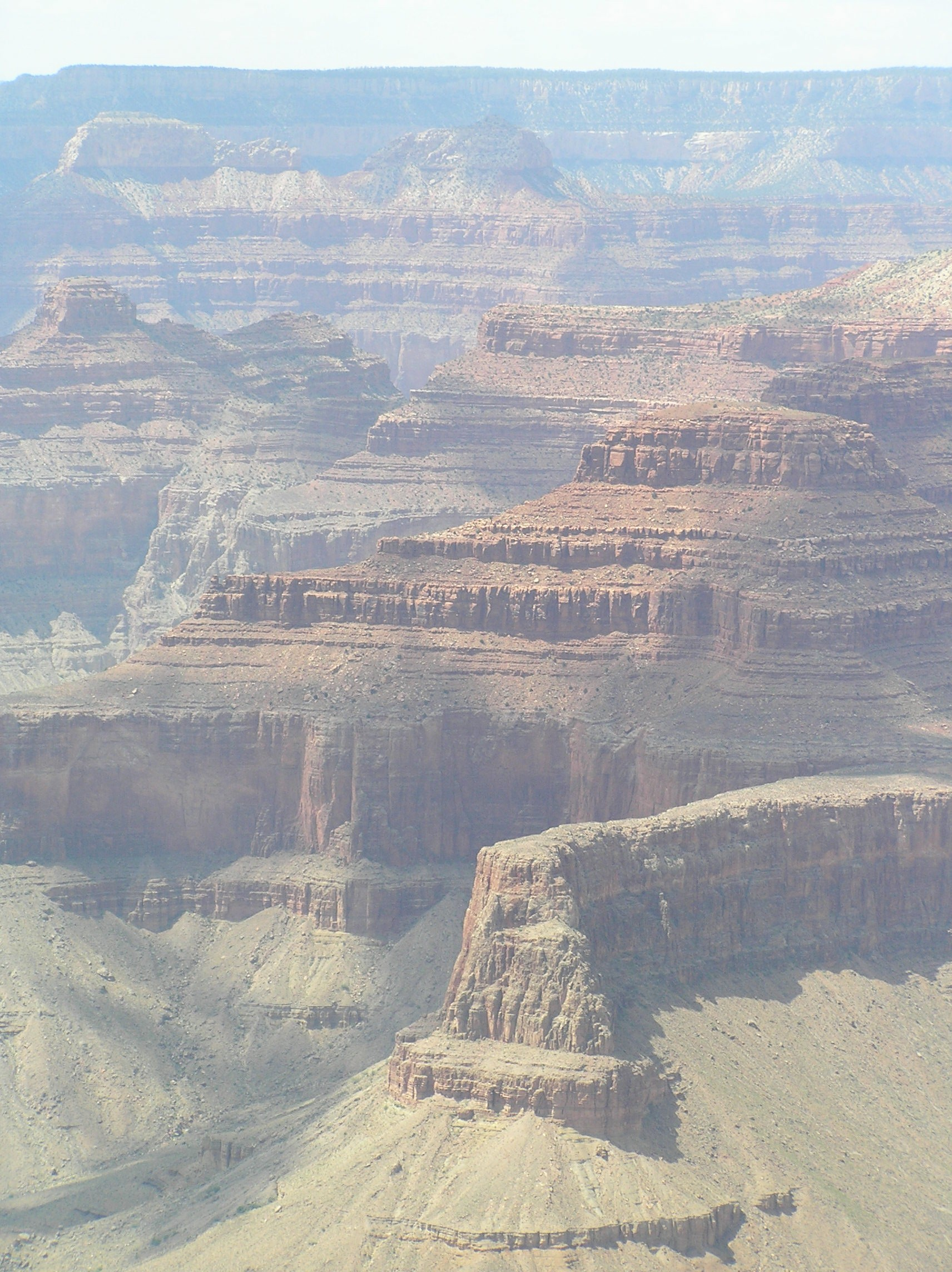
- Redwall Limestone cliff, and upper platform of cliff extension (resting on very short Muav Limestone cliff), from Tower of Set, central Grand Canyon, adjacent to Granite Gorge. The bottom of Redwall cliffs typically rest on sections of Temple Butte Formation (locally), or attached sections of Muav Limestone cliffs (regionally exposed in Grand Canyon, elsewhere in Arizona, not always with surface exposure).
- Type: Geological formation
- Underlies: Supai Group and locally Surprise Canyon Formation. The Surprise Canyon Formation fills local paleovalleys, caves, and collapse structures cut into the underlying Redwall Limestone.
- Overlies: Muav Limestone and Temple Butte Formation
- Thickness: 244 m (801 ft), at maximum

Lithology
- Primary: Fossiliferous limestone
- Other: Dolomite and chert

Location
- Region: Northern Arizona, southeast California, New Mexico, and southern Utah, Nevada
- Country: United States

Type section
- Named for: the red appearance of its escarpment on either side of the Grand Canyon
- Named by: Gilbert (1875)

The Redwall Limestone is an erosion-resistant, Mississippian age, cliff-forming geological formation that forms prominent, red-stained cliffs in the Grand Canyon. these cliffs range in height from 150 m (490 ft) to 244 m (801 ft). It is one of the most fossiliferous formations exposed in the Grand Canyon region.

== Nomenclature ==
In 1875, Gilbert recognized and named the Redwall Limestone for the red coloration of its escarpment on either side of Grand Canyon. As originally defined by him, it included some strata younger and older than as it is currently defined. Later in 1910, Darton selected a canyon that he named the Redwall Canyon in the Shinumo drainage basin, on north side of the Grand Canyon, as the type section of the Redwall Limestone. At this location, it consists mostly of the usual heavily bedded massive limestone and is circa 244 m (801 ft) thick. Noble subsequently redefined the Redwall Limestone in its present definition, which includes all strata of Mississippian age. As a result of studies in Yavapai County, Arizona, Gutschick recognized four informal members within the Redwall Limestone and McKee later formally named them. The most comprehensive study of the Redwall Limestone is the History of the Redwall Limestone of northern Arizona by McKee and Gutschick.

== Description ==
Redwall Limestone consists predominantly of light-olive-gray to light-gray, fine- to coarse-grained, thin- to thick-bedded, often cherty, limestone. Its lower part consists of brownish-gray, interbedded with finely crystalline dolomite and fine- to coarse-grained limestone with layers of white chert lenses and yellowish-gray and brownish-gray, cliff-forming, thick-bedded, fine-grained dolomite.

In ascending order, the Redwall Limestone is divided into the Whitmore Wash, Thunder Springs, Mooney Falls, and Horseshoe Mesa members. All four member have their type locality in the Grand Canyon or its tributaries. They are recognized throughout the Grand Canyon area, northern Arizona, and southern Utah. They are all Mississippian in age.

The Whitmore Wash Member is the basal, oldest, member of the Redwall Limestone. It typically forms a high, resistant cliff standing on a narrow bench or series of ledges typical of underlying strata. This member consists of nearly pure limestone and dolomite, which contains less than 2 percent insoluble gypsum and iron oxides. This member is predominately composed of thick-bedded, ranging from 0.6 to 1.22 m (2.0 to 4.0 ft) and locally thicker, limestone in western Grand Canyon and changes to mostly very thick-bedded 1.2 to 4.5 m (3.9 to 14.8 ft), fine-grained dolomite in central and eastern Grand Canyon. The limestones are composed mostly of pelletal, skeletal or oolitic wackestones and packstones. In a few places, this member exhibits conspicuous medium-scale crossbedding. In the Grand Canyon, the Whitmore Wash Member varies in thickness from about 9 m (30 ft) in the eastern Grand Canyon to nearly 30 m (98 ft) at Iceberg Ridge, 8 km (5.0 mi) beyond the western end of Grand Canyon. The overlying Thunder Springs Member lies conformably on Whitmore Wash Member and its base is easily recognized by the lowest appearance of thin, dark, chert beds alternating with thin beds of lighter gray limestone or dolomite.

The Thunder Springs Member is the most distinctive member of the Redwall Limestone, because it forms cliffs that exhibit prominent black and light-brown banding. Its light and dark banded appearance is imparted by thin beds of either light gray limestone or light gray dolomite alternating with thin beds of dark reddish brown or dark gray beds or lenses of chert. Most of the limestone is fine to very coarse, thin-bedded, crinoidal grainstone or packstone. The carbonate beds vary from being predominately limestone in the western Grand Canyon and to predominately dolomite in the eastern Grand Canyon. The thin chert beds in this member consist of silicified bryozoan wackestones and lime mudstones. The Thunder Springs Member gradually increases in thickness from 30 m (98 ft) in eastern Grand Canyon to about 46 m (151 ft) in the western Grand Canyon. The contact of the overlying Mooney Falls Member with the underlying Thunder Springs Member is disconformable except in the extreme western end of Grand Canyon. Locally, this contact is a low-angle unconformity. This is indicative of a period of emergence, minor tectonic activity, and erosion between the deposition of the Thunder Springs and Mooney Falls members.

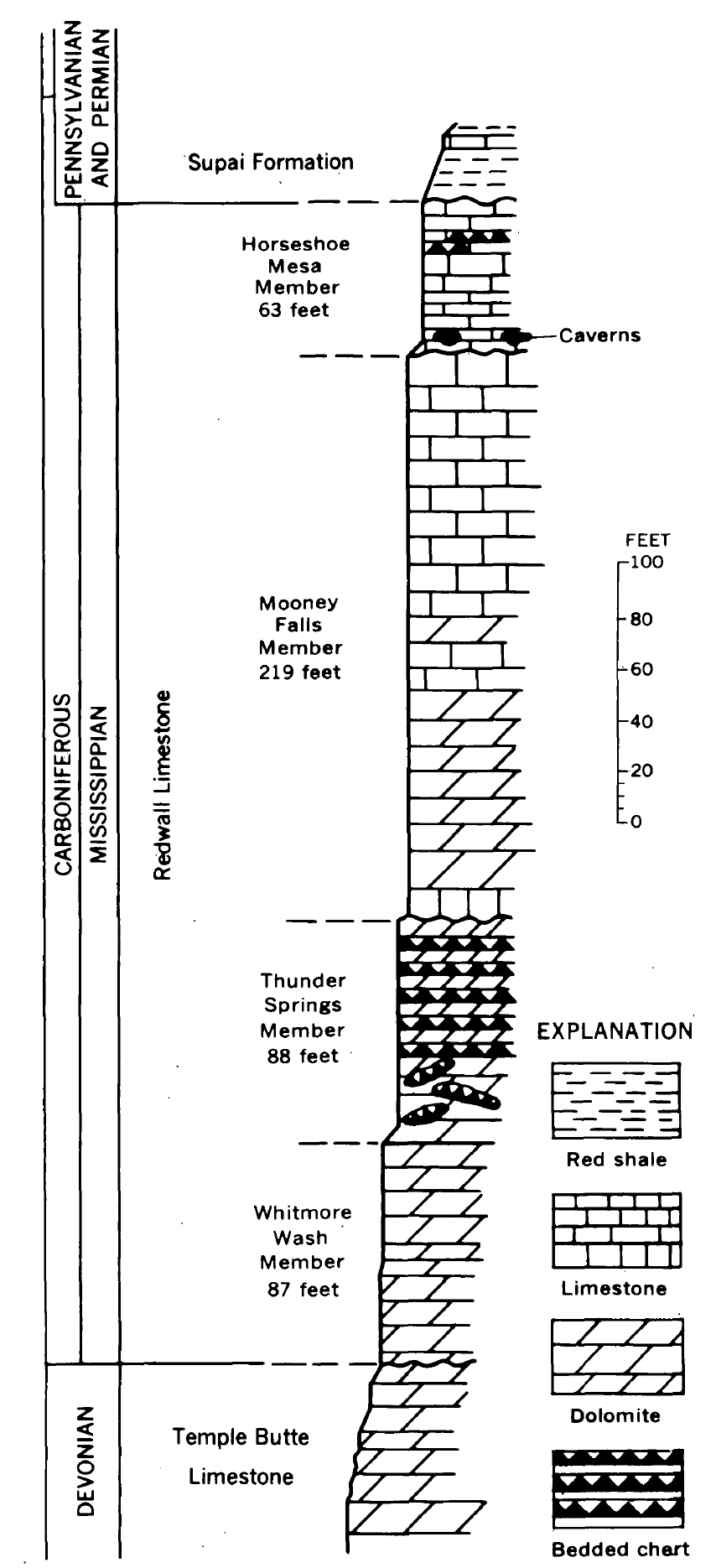
Stratigraphic column showing stratigraphic relations, lithology, and thickness of the members of the Redwall Limestone along the Bright Angel Trail, Grand Canyon

The Mooney Falls Member forms a major part of the high, sheer escarpment for which the Redwall Limestone is named. It consists predominantly of pure limestone, except locally where it is dolomitized. It contains less than 0.5 percent insoluble residue. These limestones consist of oolites, pellets, and a variety of skeletal fragments dominated by crinoid plates. In its upper part near its contact with the overlying Horseshoe Mesa Member, one or two zones containing thin beds or lenses of chert occur. The Mooney Falls Member is normally thick-bedded and looks massive in outcrop. The upper third of this member at several localities in central and eastern Grand Canyon reportedly exhibits large-scale, tabular-planar cross-bedding. The Mooney Falls Member is the thickest member of the Redwall, ranging from about 61 m (200 ft) in eastern Grand Canyon to nearly 120 m (390 ft) at the western end. The overlying Horseshoe Mesa Member lies conformably on the Mooney Falls Member and its contact can be difficult to define in outcrops. Typically, the boundary is located at the change from vertical, cliff-forming, medium- and coarse-grained, and thick- or massive-bedded limestone to a receding-ledge-forming, fine-grained, and relatively thin-bedded, limestone.

The Horseshoe Mesa Member is the youngest, thinnest, and of the least areal extensive member of the Redwall Limestone. This member is normally composed of thin-bedded, light gray, fine-grained, limestone, typically a mudstone to wackestone that commonly contains encrusting and sediment-binding algal structures. It contains some chert lenses in its lower part. Also, crossbedding, ripple marks, and oolite beds occur locally. The Horseshoe Mesa Member typically forms weak receding ledges in contrast to the massive cliff that characterizes the Mooney Falls below. Within the Grand Canyon it varies from 14 to 38 m (46 to 125 ft). It normally thinnest in the eastern Grand Canyon. Because of erosion, this member wedges out 48 to 64 km (30 to 40 mi) south of the Grand Canyon. The Horseshoe Mesa Member is also absent from the Redwall Limestone in most of central Arizona.

== Contacts ==
The upper and lower contacts of the Redwall Limestone are both unconformities. The lower contact of the Redwall Limestone is a disconformity that rests either on upon the Devonian Temple Butte Formation or, where it is missing in the eastern Grand Canyon, strata of Cambrian Tonto Group. Often, the Redwall Limestone immediately overlying this disconformity contains a basal conglomerate. Normally, this basal conglomerate is composed of gravel that is locally derived from either the underlying Temple Butte Formation or Muav Limestone. In the eastern Grand Canyon, the Temple Butte Formation consists of a thin, discontinuous layer of Devonian strata that fills paleovalleys cut into the underlying Cambrian Muav Limestone. Westward, the Temple Butte Formation thickens until it becomes a continuous, westward thickening, layer underlying the Redwall Limestone. In western Grand Canyon, this contact consist of an irregular erosional surface having up to 3 m (9.8 ft) of relief in a lateral distance of 30 to 61 m (98 to 200 ft). The duration of geologic time represented by this unconformity increases eastward across the Grand Canyon and the rest of northern Arizona.

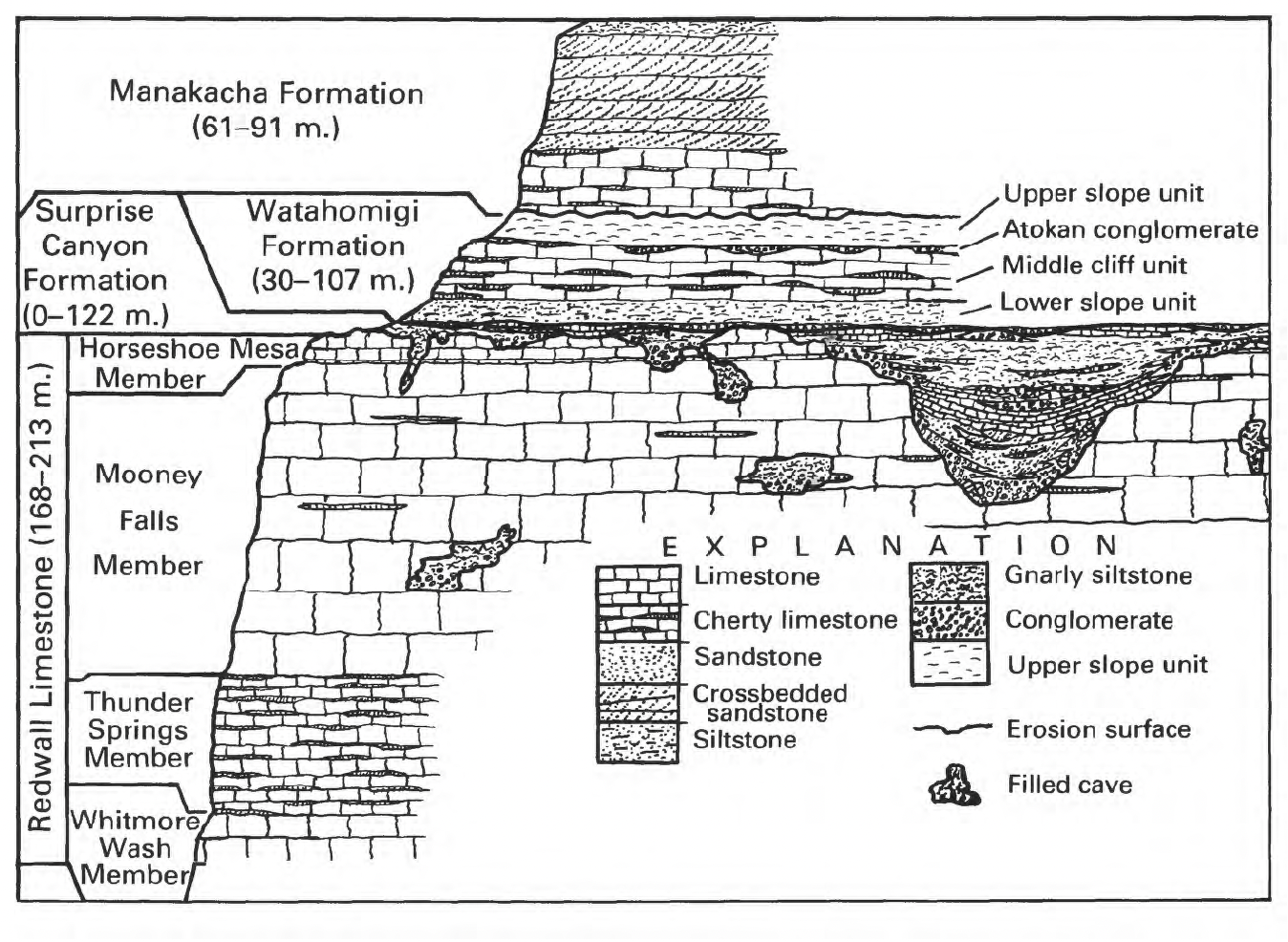
Schematic cross-section of unconformity at the top of the Redwall Limestone showing paleochannels and karstified paleosurface that form it and stratigraphic relationships of Redwall Limestone, its members, Surprise Canyon Formation, and Watahomigi Formation (Supai Group)

The upper contact of the Redwall Limestone is a disconformity that represents a buried, irregular and karstified paleosurface that contains many contemporaneous caves and collapse structures. Eroded into this paleosurafce are the remnants of a westward-draining network of coastal paleovalleys and paleochannels. Filling these buried paleovalleys, paleochannels, caves, and collapse structures are sedimentary strata of the Surprise Canyon Formation. Overlying the Surprise Canyon Formation and adjacent protruding paleosurface of the Redwall Limestone are marine, fluvial, and aeolian deposits of the Supai Group. The paleovalleys are incised as much as 122 m (400 ft) through the underlying Horseshoe Mesa and Mooney Falls members and into the Thunder Springs Member.

== Fossils ==
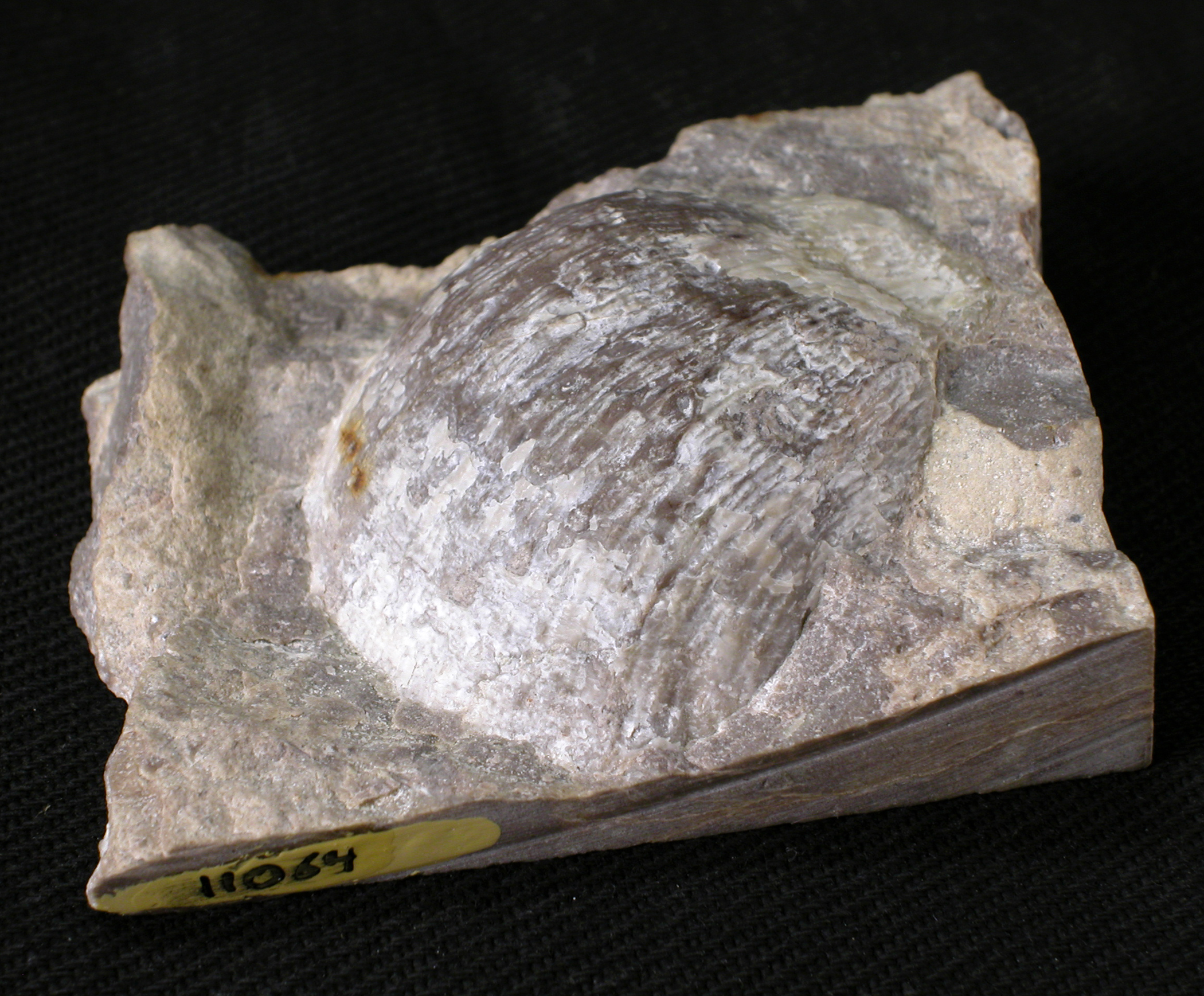
Fossil Brachiopod from Redwall Limestone. Image courtesy of Grand Canyon National Park.

Overall, the strata of the Redwall Limestone commonly contain the fossils of shallow marine animals. The analysis of data collected by McKee and Gutschick found that the most abundant macrofossils are brachiopods and corals. they are followed in abundance by bryozoans, crinoids, bivalves, invertebrate burrows and trails, and cephalopods. Less common are the fossils of blastoids, trilobites, ostracods, fish teeth, and algal remains. Microfossils of foraminifers and conodonts have also been found.

The members of the Redwall Limestone vary greatly in the abundance and preservation of fossils that they contain. As the result of the extensive alteration of the original sediments and bioclasts by dolomitization, fossils are rare in the Whitmore Wash Member. However, nautiloid fossils are found in abundance at in the Whitmore Wash Member at Nautiloid Canyon. The chert beds of the Thunder Springs Member contain an abundance invertebrate marine fossils. The fossils found in these cherts are corals (particularly the colonial coral, Syringapara), bryozoans, brachiopods, crinoids, and a few gastropods, blastoids, and cephalopods. Similar fossils and conodonts occur in the carbonate beds of the Thunder Springs Member. They are less abundant and not at well preserved, likely as the result of alteration of the original sediments by dolomitization. Invertebrate marine fossils are abundant throughout the Mooney Falls Member. They include solitary and colonial corals, spiriferid brachiopods, crinoids, foraminifers, and conodonts. Finally, although rare, well-preserved, invertebrate, marine fossils are present throughout the Horseshoe Mesa Member. Among the most abundant fossils found in it are spiriferid brachiopods, bivalves, and corals. In addition, at least 16 species of foraminifers occur in it.

== Age ==
The Redwall Limestone has yielded index fossils that constrain its time of accumulation. The initial accumulation of the basal Whitmore Wash Member in western Grand Canyon occurred during early Early Mississippian time. The basal strata of the Redwall Limestone become progressively younger as the sea transgressed eastward across northern Arizona and submerged it under a shallow epeiric sea. Thus, they are no older than late Early Mississippian age in eastern Grand Canyon. Subsequently, the shallow marine sediments comprising the Thunder Springs Member accumulated as the sea regressed back towards the west leaving northern as dry land. Terrestrial weathering, erosion, and lack of sediment accumulation formed an unconfortmity separating the Thunder Springs and Mooney Falls members. A second marine transgression submerged northern Arizona and permitted the accumulation of shallow marine sediments that comprise the Mooney Falls Member. The Horseshoe Mesa Member accumulated during early Late Mississippian time as the shoreline retreated westward and back into Nevada.

The age of the Redwall Limestone indicates that it accumulated during the same period of time as the Escabrosa Limestone of southeastern Arizona, the Leadville Limestone of southwestern Colorado, and the Monte Cristo Group of southeastern Nevada. Four of the five formations in the Monte Cristo share nearly identical lithologic characteristics and stratigraphic position with the four members of the Redwall Limestone in northern Arizona. It is likely that the Redwall Limestone deposits were laterally continuous with all the above unit.

== See also ==
- Geology of the Grand Canyon area
