= Hubbell Butte =

Landform in the Grand Canyon, Arizona

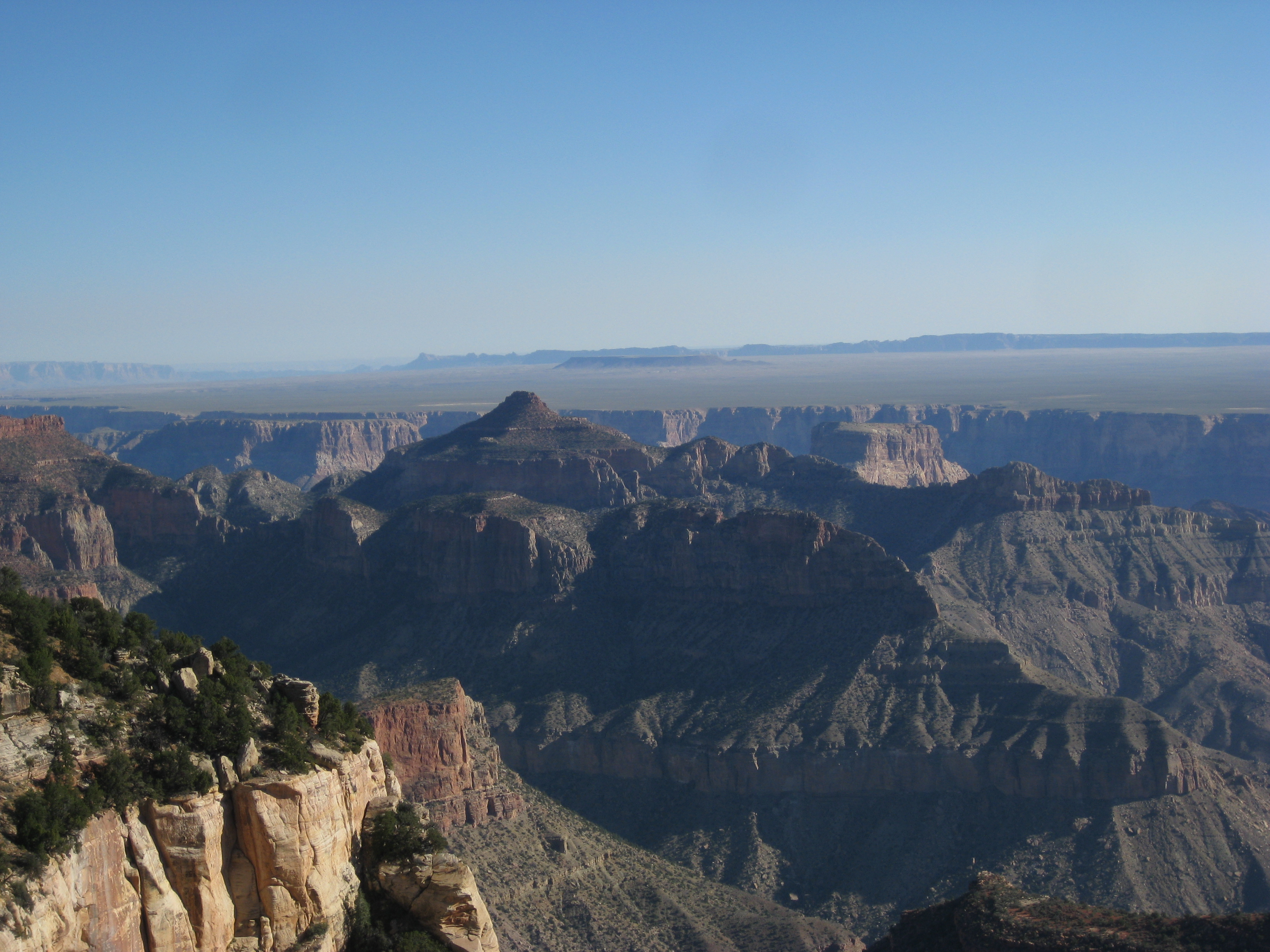

Highest point
- Elevation: 6,740 ft (2,050 m)
- Prominence: 280 ft (85 m)
- Parent peak: Siegfried Pyre
- Isolation: 0.84 mi (1.35 km)
- Coordinates: 36.18708°N 111.89972°W

Geography
- Location within Arizona Location within the United States
- Location: Grand Canyon National Park; Coconino County, Arizona, US
- Parent range: Kaibab Plateau (Walhalla Plateau); Colorado Plateau
- Topo map: USGS Walhalla Plateau

Geology
- Rock age: Permian down to Cambrian
- Mountain type(s): sedimentary rock: sandstone, siltstone, mudstone, sandstone, shale
- Rock type(s): Supai Group, Redwall Limestone, Muav Limestone, Bright Angel Shale

Hubbell Butte is a 6,740 ft-elevation summit located in the eastern Grand Canyon, in Coconino County of northern Arizona, United States. It is situated ~1.5 miles northeast of Cape Final (North Rim, Walhalla Plateau,(Kaibab Plateau)). Hubbell Butte lies about 1.0 mile southeast of Siegfried Pyre, both prominences adjacent 2.0 miles east of the Walhalla Plateau. The butte is about 5.0 miles west of the Colorado River, as it flows south through Marble Canyon, and the butte lies in the Upper Lava Creek watershed.

Hubbell Butte is composed of Supai Group units, sitting upon Redwall Limestone cliffs. The west flank of Hubbell Butte is on a north section of Lava Creek, and is adjacent, north, to the ridgeline of Siegfried Pyre, with its prominence, and two adjacent sub-prominences.

== History ==
Hubbell Butte is named for Don Lorenzo Hubbell, a famous trader for the Navajos. The Lorenzo Hubbell Trading Post and Warehouse is his legacy.

== Geography: local prominences ==
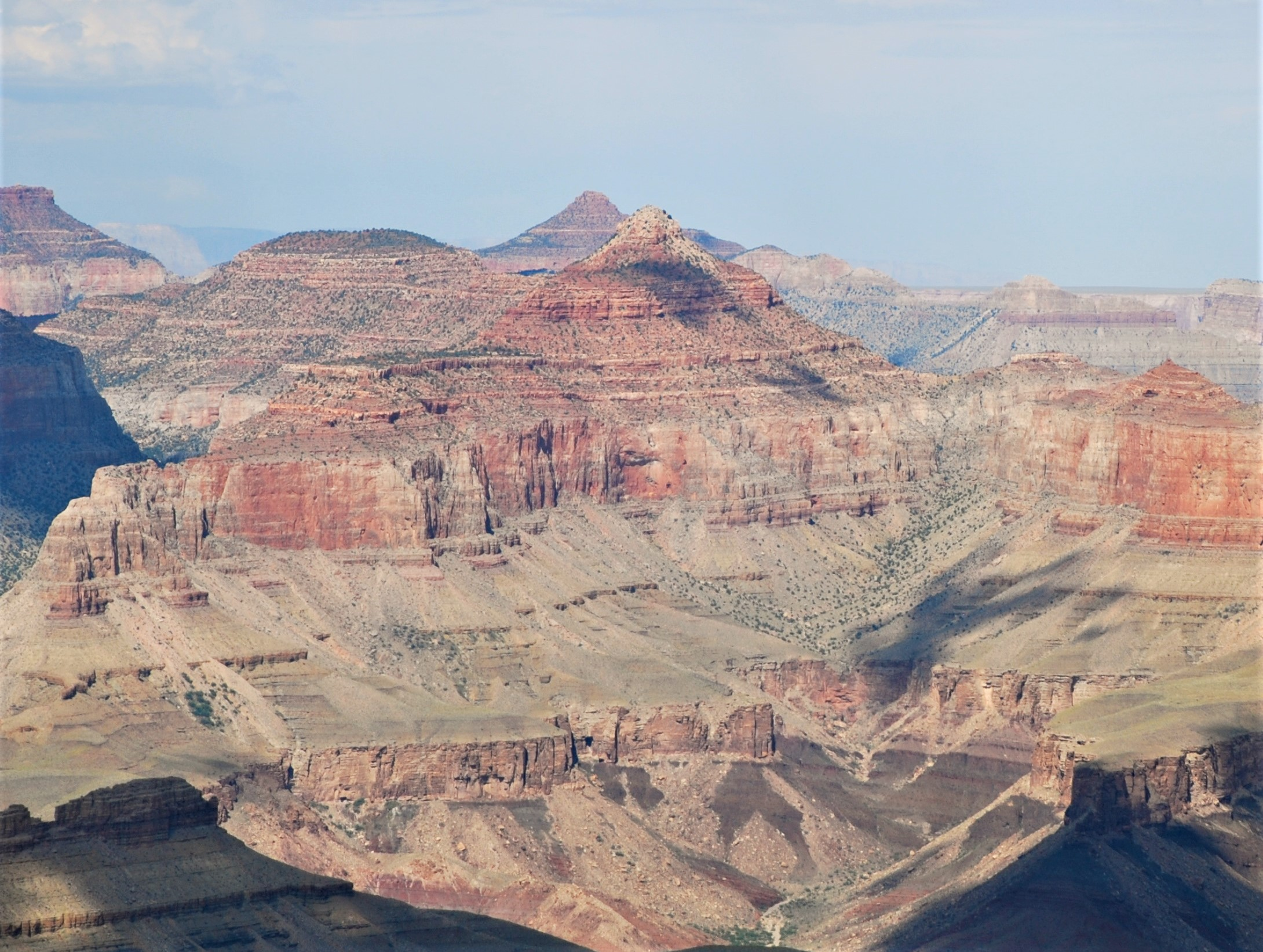
Naji Point-(upper left), Point Final—(middle left). Hubbell Butte, then linear prominence of Juno Temple, then the highest prominence: Jupiter Temple-(photo foreground).

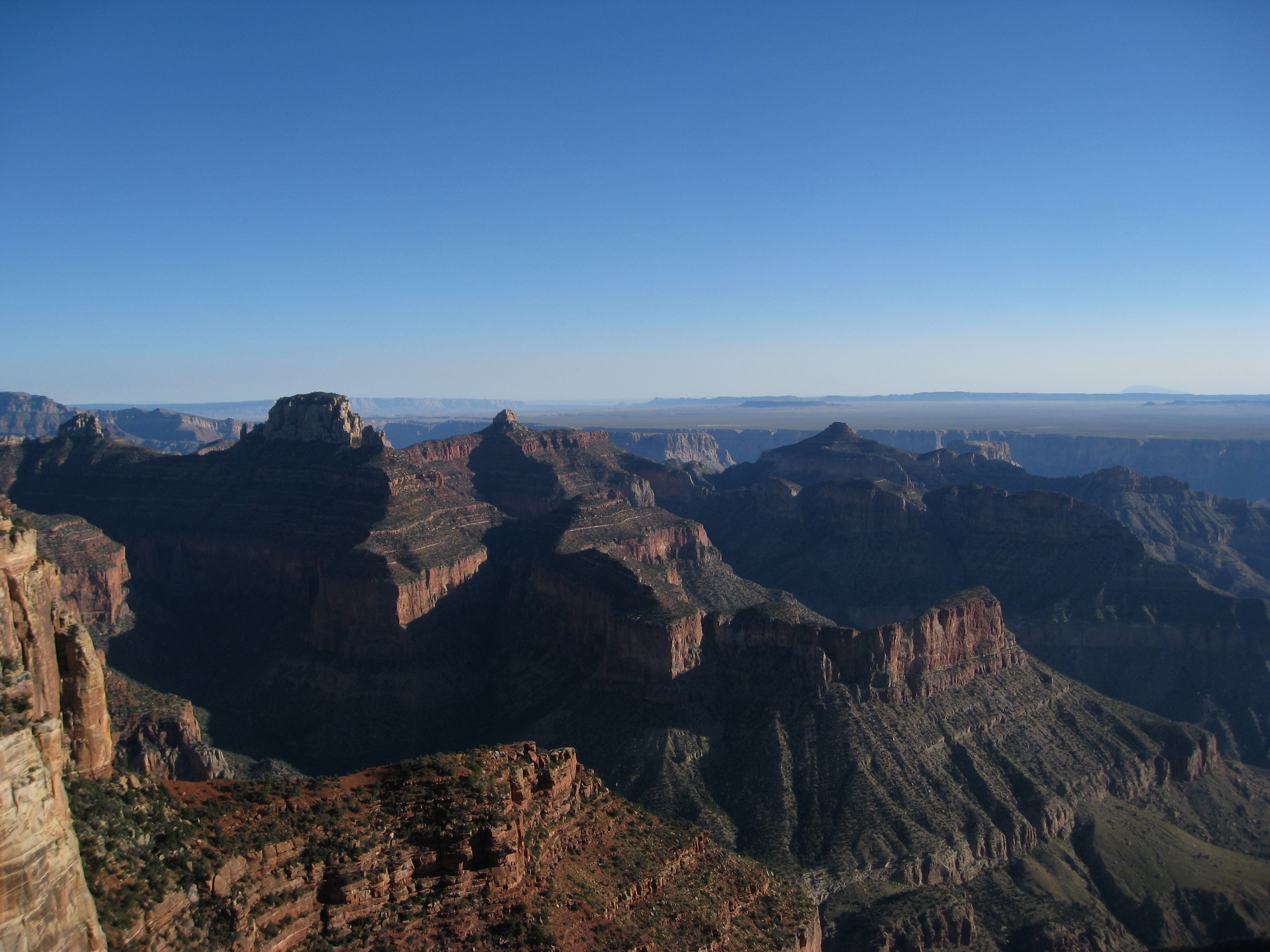
Siegfried Pyre ridgeline-(left) & Hubbell Butte-(right)

Hubbell Butte, its neighbor south, Poston Butte, and east, Chiavria Point, are all part of the Upper Lava Creek watershed. The headwaters, are at the water divide formed by the Siegfried Pyre ridgeline, which is formed by the upper unit 4 of the Supai Group, the Esplanade Sandstone, a cliff-former, but also forms a horizontal platform. Three prominences are on the ridgeline, Butte 7685, close to the East Rim, (north of Naji Point), and Butte 7602 (Butchart Butte), adjacent the northeast end of the ridgeline.

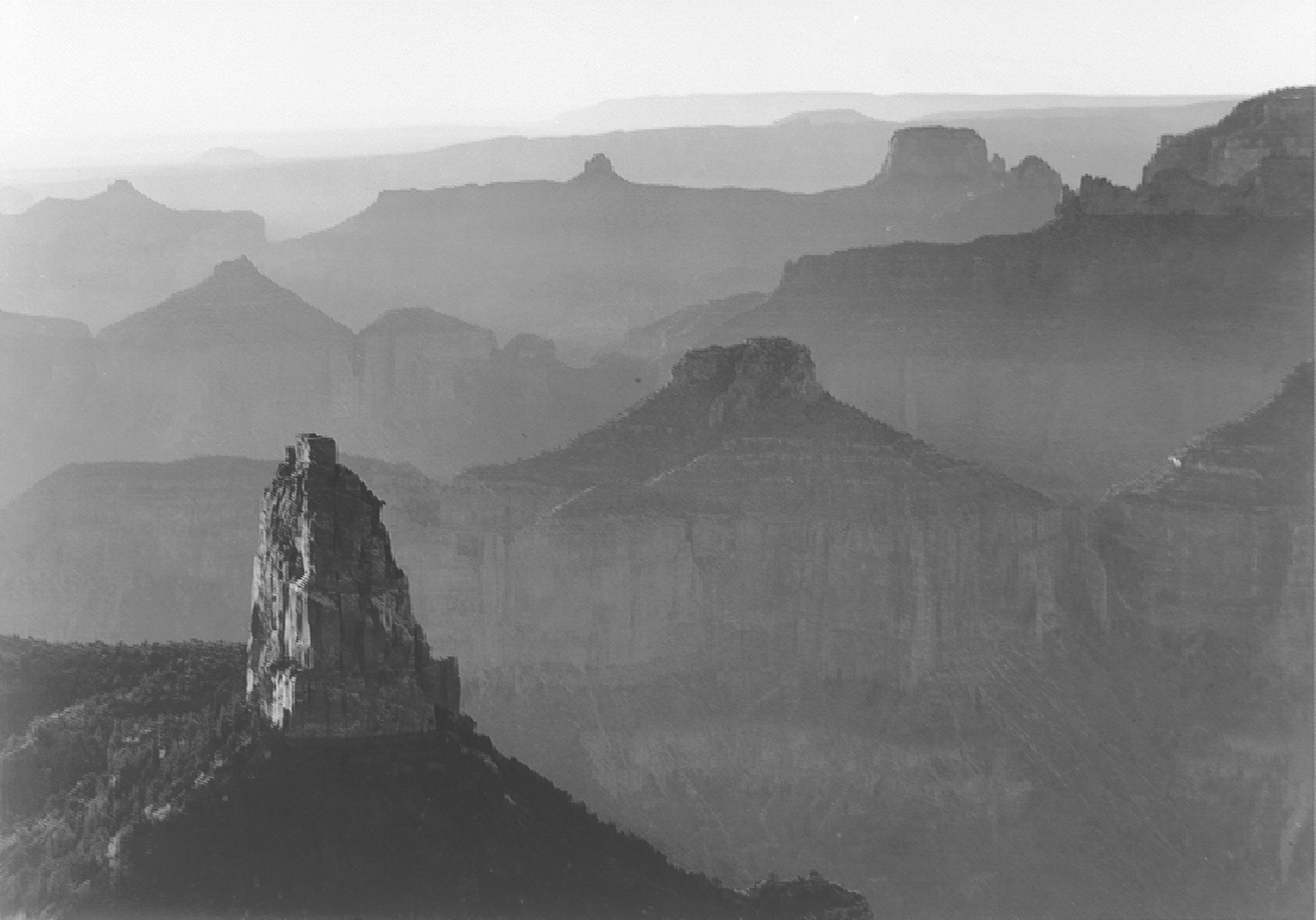
North aspect of the Siegfried Pyre ridgeline, from Point Imperial.

South of the three landforms in the Upper Lava Creek watershed, are prominences on the water divide between the Upper Unkar Creek watershed, south, and the Upper Basalt Creek watershed, north. Juno Temple is north, and the higher, and more prominent, Jupiter Temple is south. Jupiter Temple is adjacent to Venus and Apollo Temples, southeasterly; Apollo and Venus Temples are upon the basement rocks (below the Great Unconformity), units of the Unkar Group, colorful and dipping at an angle below the Butte Fault, as the Colorado River, changes its south-course into the East Grand Canyon.

Photos looking northwards, can show Point Final, Naji Point, Hubbell Butte, Jupiter Temple, and Venus Temple.
