= Venus Temple =

Landform in the Grand Canyon, Arizona

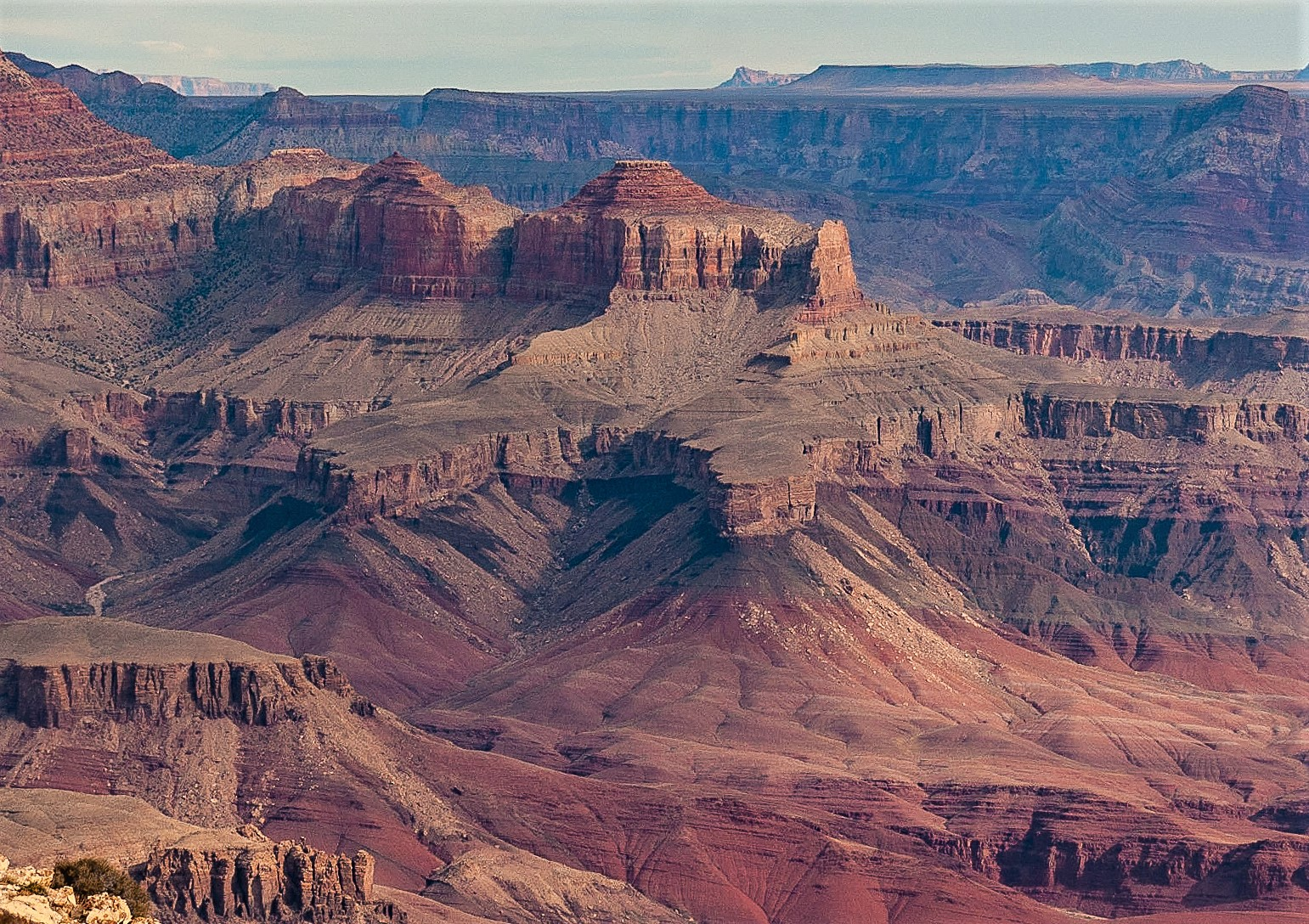
- Venus Temple-(left), Apollo Temple-(right)

Highest point
- Elevation: 6,281 ft (1,914 m)
- Prominence: 501 ft (153 m)
- Parent peak: Jupiter Temple
- Isolation: 0.86 mi (1.38 km)
- Coordinates: 36.1234963°N 111.8834947°W

Geography
- Location within Arizona Location within the United States
- Location: Grand Canyon National Park; Coconino County, Arizona, US
- Parent range: Kaibab Plateau (Walhalla Plateau); Colorado Plateau
- Topo map: USGS Cape Royal

Geology
- Rock age: Pennsylvanian down to Neoproterozoic
- Mountain type(s): sedimentary rock: sandstone, siltstone, mudstone, limestone, shale volcanic rock: basalt
- Rock type(s): Supai Group, Redwall Limestone, Muav Limestone, Bright Angel Shale, Tapeats Sandstone, Grand Canyon Supergroup-(4 units), 2–Nankoweap Formation, 1–Unkar Group-members-(5); 5_Cardenas Basalt, 4_Dox Formation

Venus Temple is a 6,281-foot-elevation summit located in the eastern Grand Canyon, in Coconino County of northern Arizona, US. The landform is attached to Apollo Temple immediately south-southeast. Venus Temple is ~2.0 mi northwest of the southwest-flowing Colorado River. Both Venus and Apollo Temples are 4.0 mi west of the south end of the Grand Canyon’s East Rim. The east side of Venus Temple drains into Upper Basalt Canyon and Creek; the west side drains west-then-south into Lower Unkar Creek.

The prominence of Venus Temple is composed of lower members of the orange-red Supai Group on the upper platform of the cliff-forming Redwall Limestone, upon the Cambrian Tonto Group. Members of the Grand Canyon Supergroup lie below.

== See also ==
- Geology of the Grand Canyon area
- Juno Temple (Grand Canyon)
