= Butchart Butte =

Landform in the Grand Canyon, Arizona

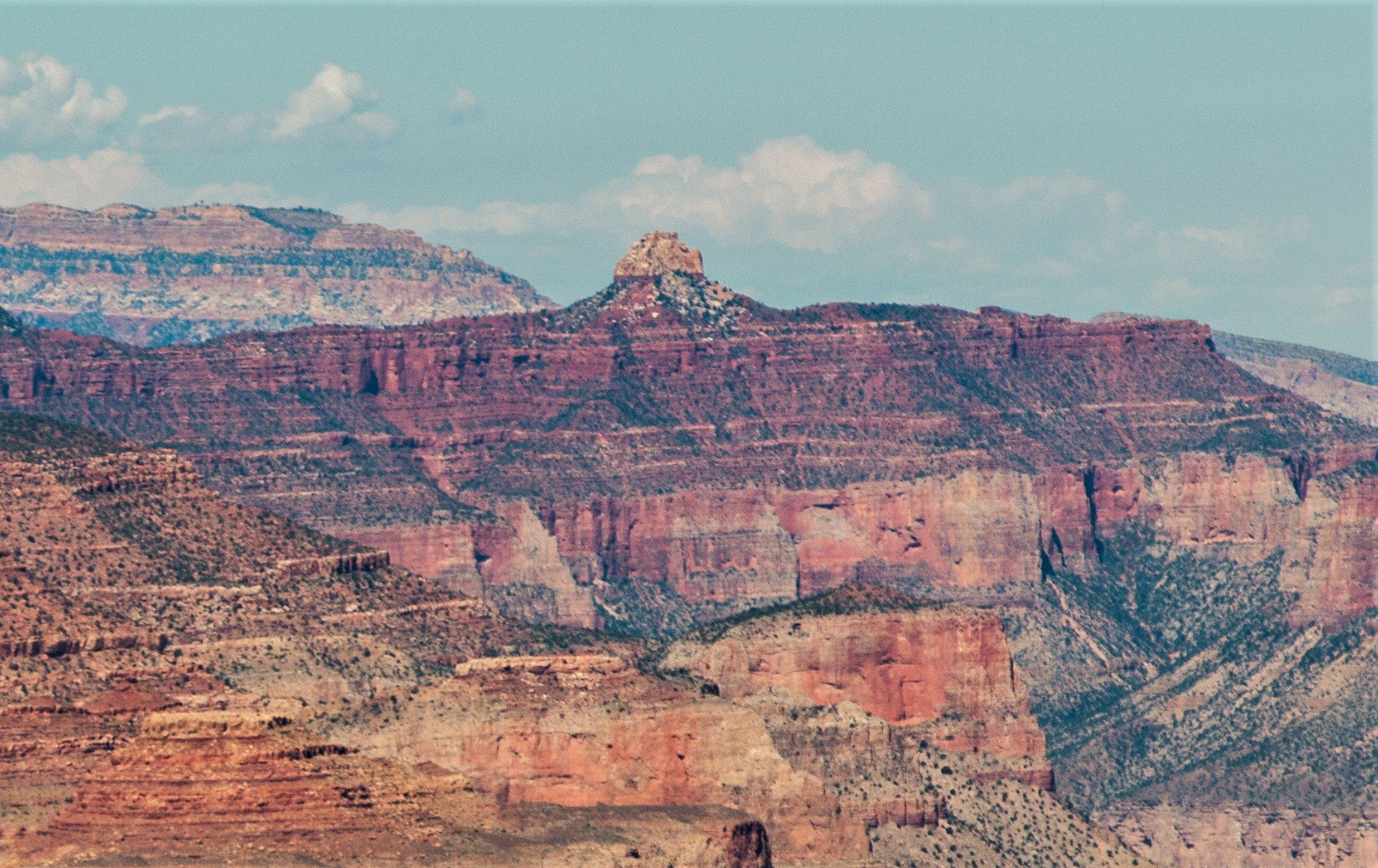
- Butchart Butte, south aspect

Highest point
- Elevation: 7,602 ft (2,317 m)
- Prominence: 542 ft (165 m)
- Parent peak: Siegfried Pyre (7,922 ft)
- Isolation: 0.80 mi (1.29 km)
- Coordinates: 36°12′15″N 111°53′48″W

Naming
- Etymology: Harvey Butchart

Geography
- Location within Arizona Location within the United States
- Country: United States
- State: Arizona
- County: Coconino
- Protected area: Grand Canyon National Park
- Parent range: Kaibab Plateau; Colorado Plateau
- Topo map: USGS Walhalla Plateau

Geology
- Rock type(s): sandstone, limestone, mudstone

Climbing
- Easiest route: class 5.1 climbing

Butchart Butte is a 7,602-foot (2,317 m)-elevation summit located in the Grand Canyon, in Coconino County of northern Arizona, United States. It is situated on the North Rim, midway between Gunther Castle and Siegfried Pyre, and between the Chuar and Kwagunt Valleys. Topographic relief is significant as it rises 4,900 feet (1,500 m) above the Colorado River in five miles.

This butte is named in honor for Dr. John Harvey Butchart (1907–2002), a mathematics professor and explorer well known for his hiking and climbing accomplishments at the Grand Canyon. He climbed 83 summits and claimed 28 first ascents within the canyon, for which he holds the record. This feature's name was officially adopted in 2009 by the U.S. Board on Geographic Names. Fellow canyoneer Jim Haggart submitted the naming proposal for consideration, and whereas Butchart did climb nearest higher neighbor Siegfried Pyre, he did not climb this butte that now bears his name.

Butchart Butte is composed of a cupola of remnant Permian Coconino Sandstone overlaying strata of the Pennsylvanian-Permian Supai Group. This in turn overlays the cliff-forming layer of Mississippian Redwall Limestone, which in turn overlays Cambrian Tonto Group, and finally Neoproterozoic Chuar Group at river level. According to the Köppen climate classification system, Butchart Butte is located in a Cold semi-arid climate zone. Precipitation runoff from this feature drains to the nearby Colorado River via Chuar Creek (southeast) and Kwagunt Creek (northeast).

== Gallery ==
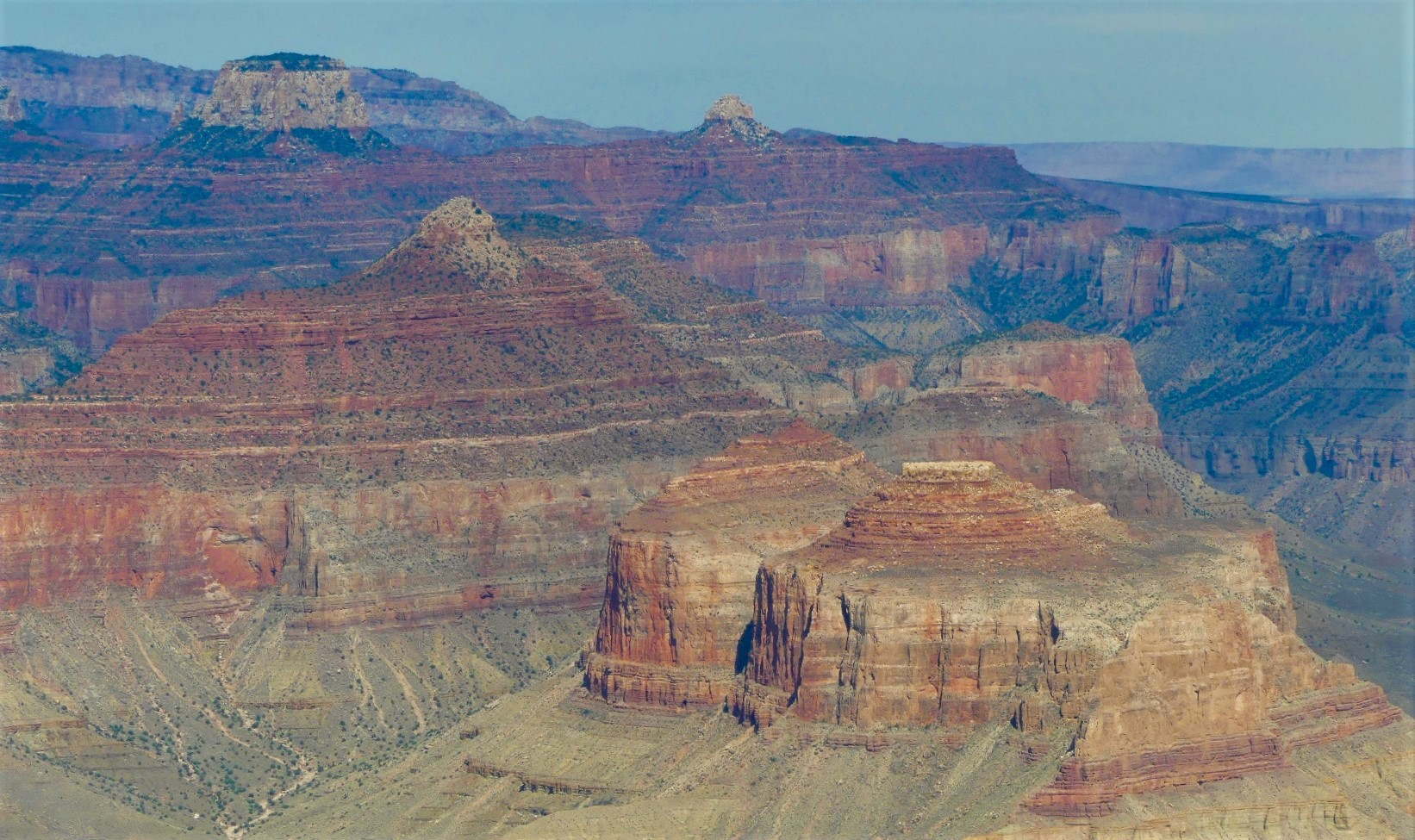
Butchart Butte centered at top, South aspect, aerial view.

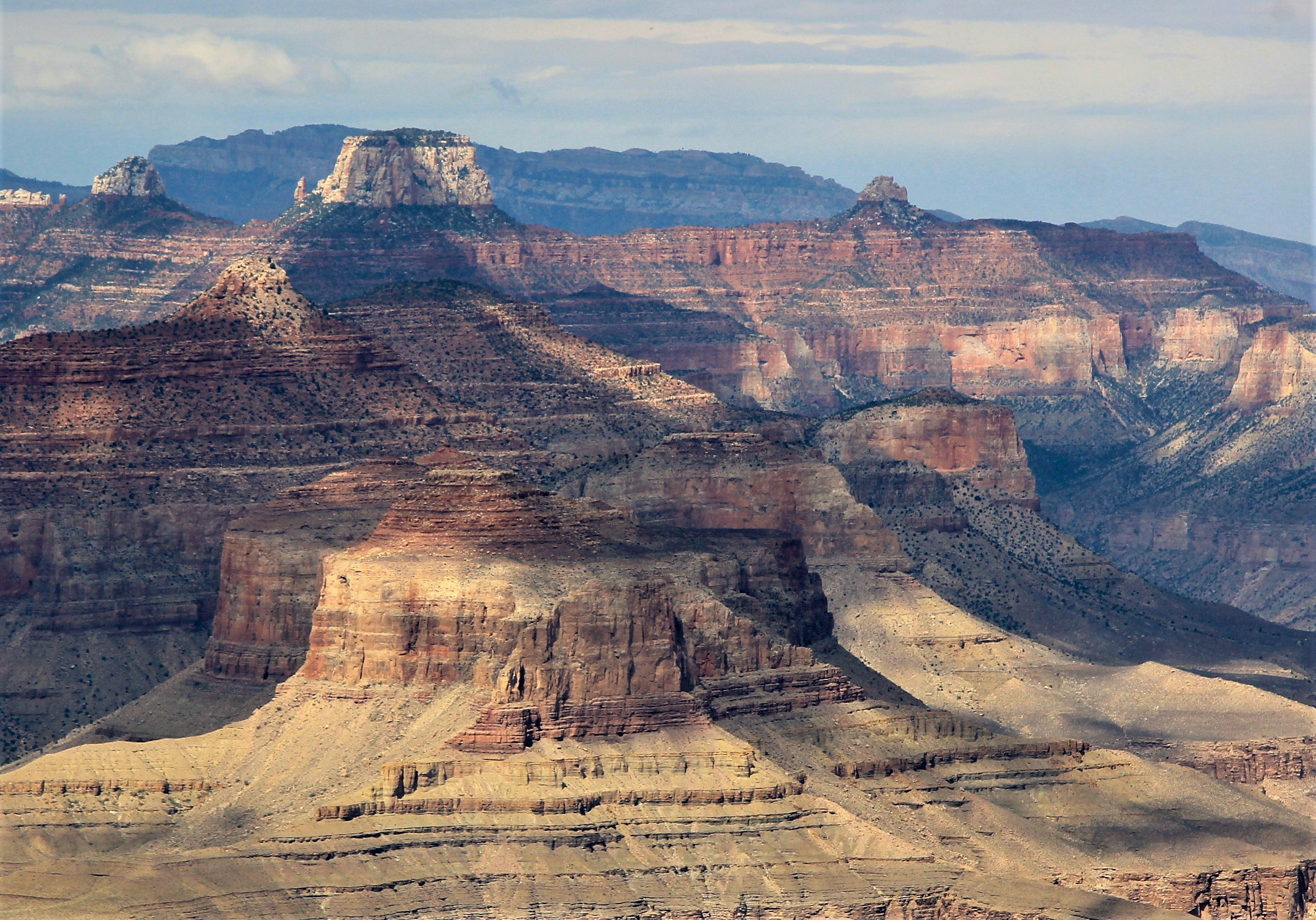
Butchart Butte in upper right. Also in the frame are Apollo Temple, Jupiter Temple, and Siegfried Pyre.

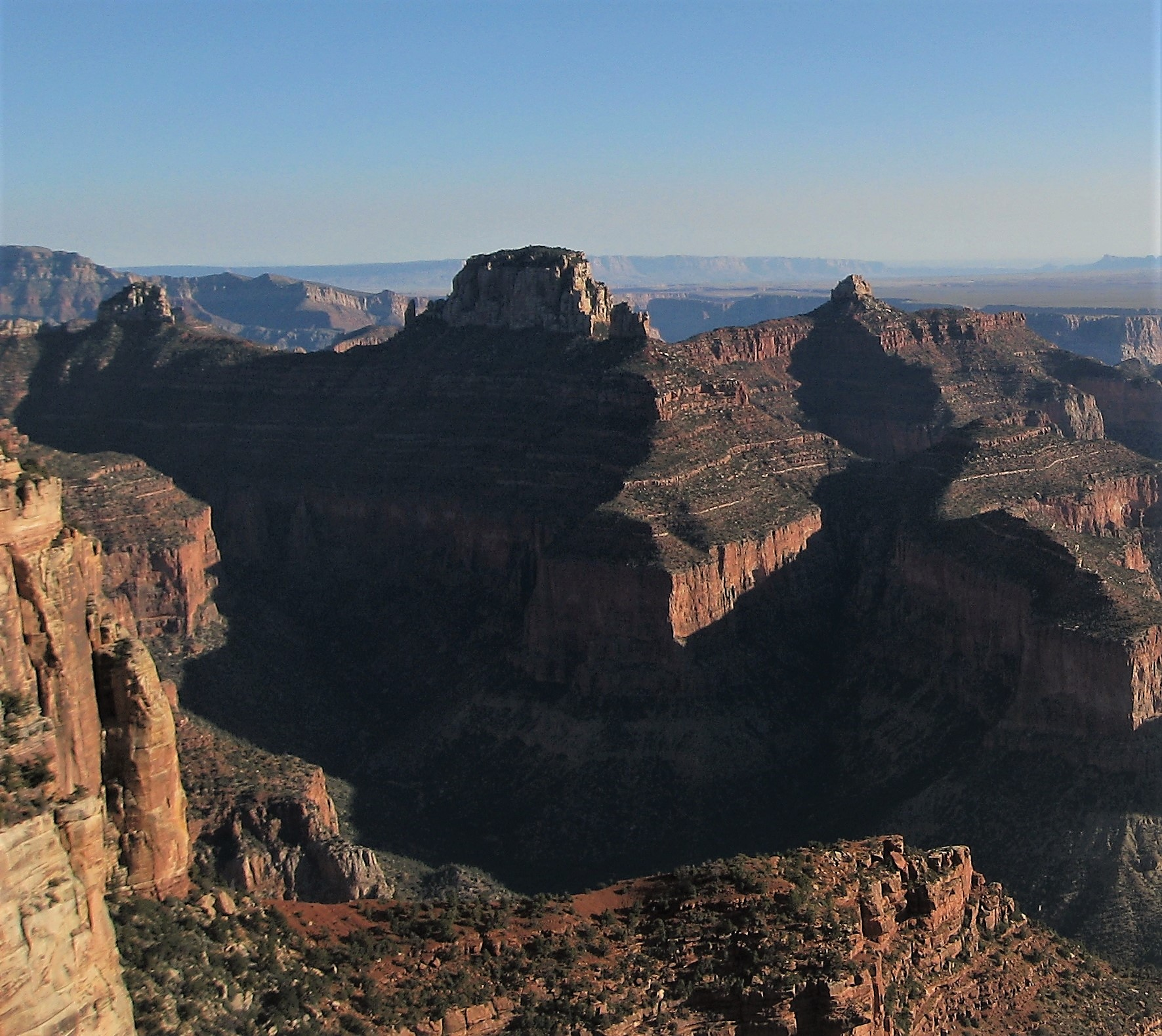
Siegfried Pyre centered with Butchart Butte to right. From Cape Final.

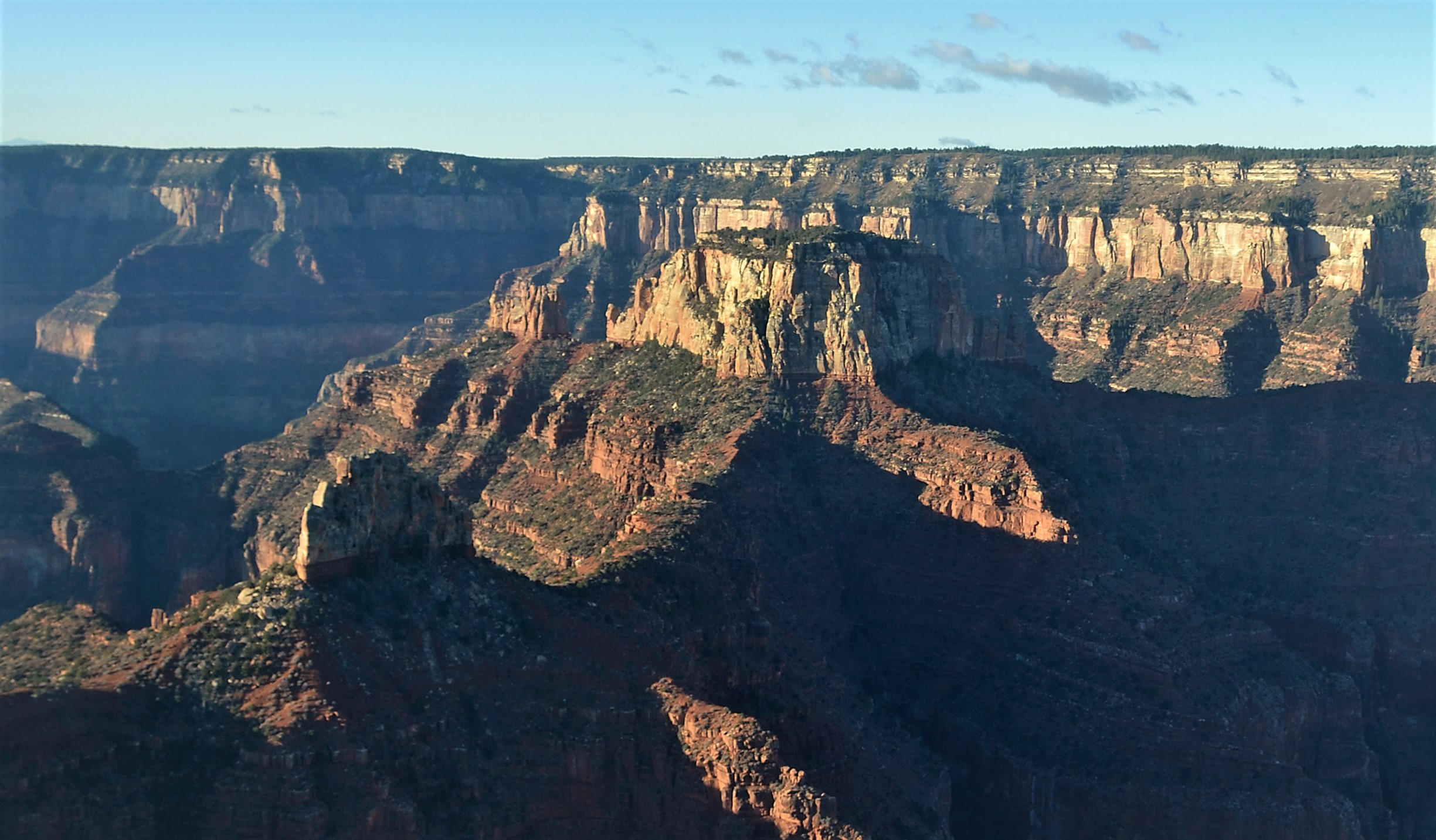
Aerial looking southwest at Siegfried Pyre (centered) and Butchart Butte (lower left)

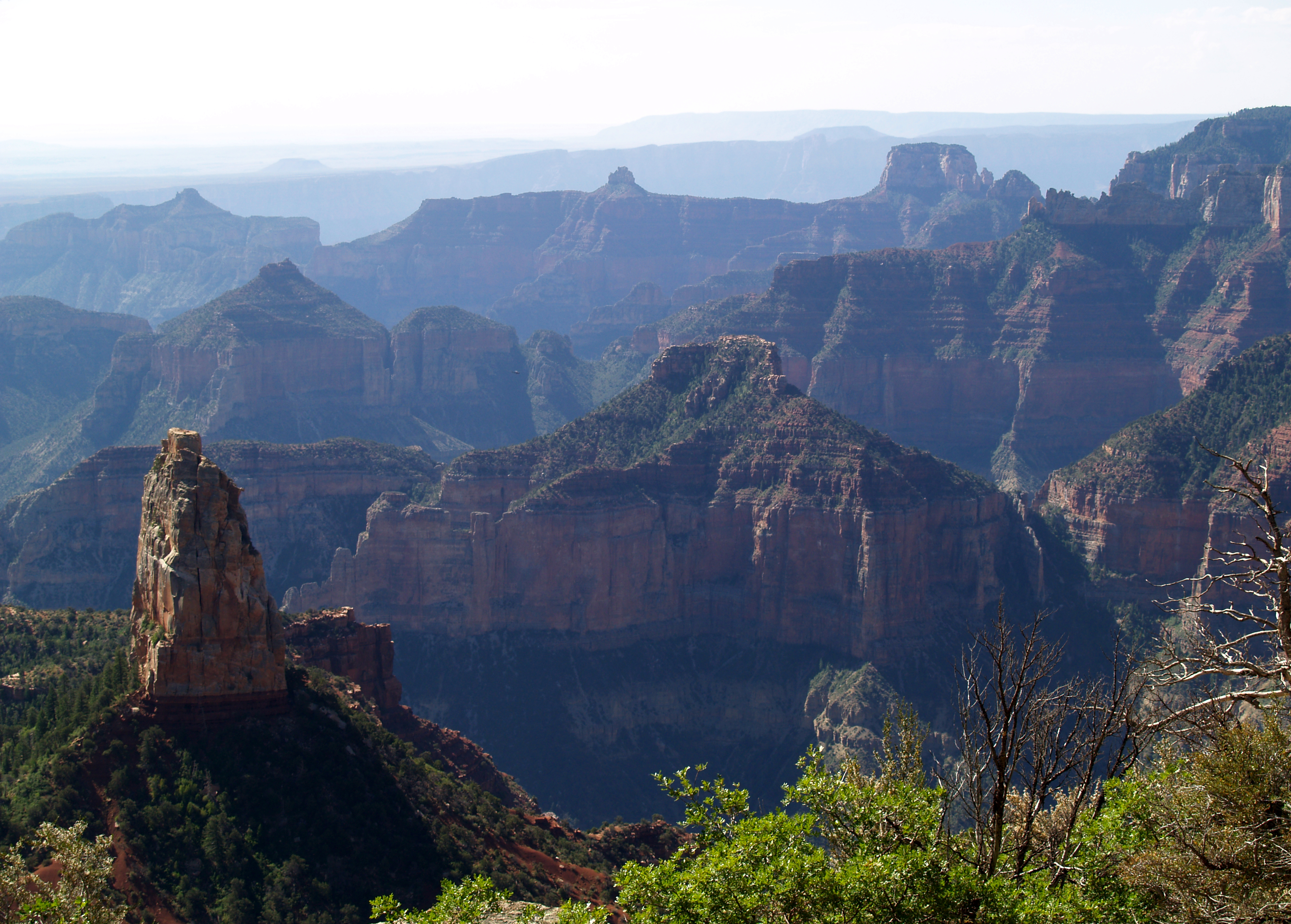
Butchart Butte centered in back, looking southeast from Point Imperial. Also in the field of view: Mount Hayden, Colter Butte, Alsap Butte, and Siegfried Pyre.

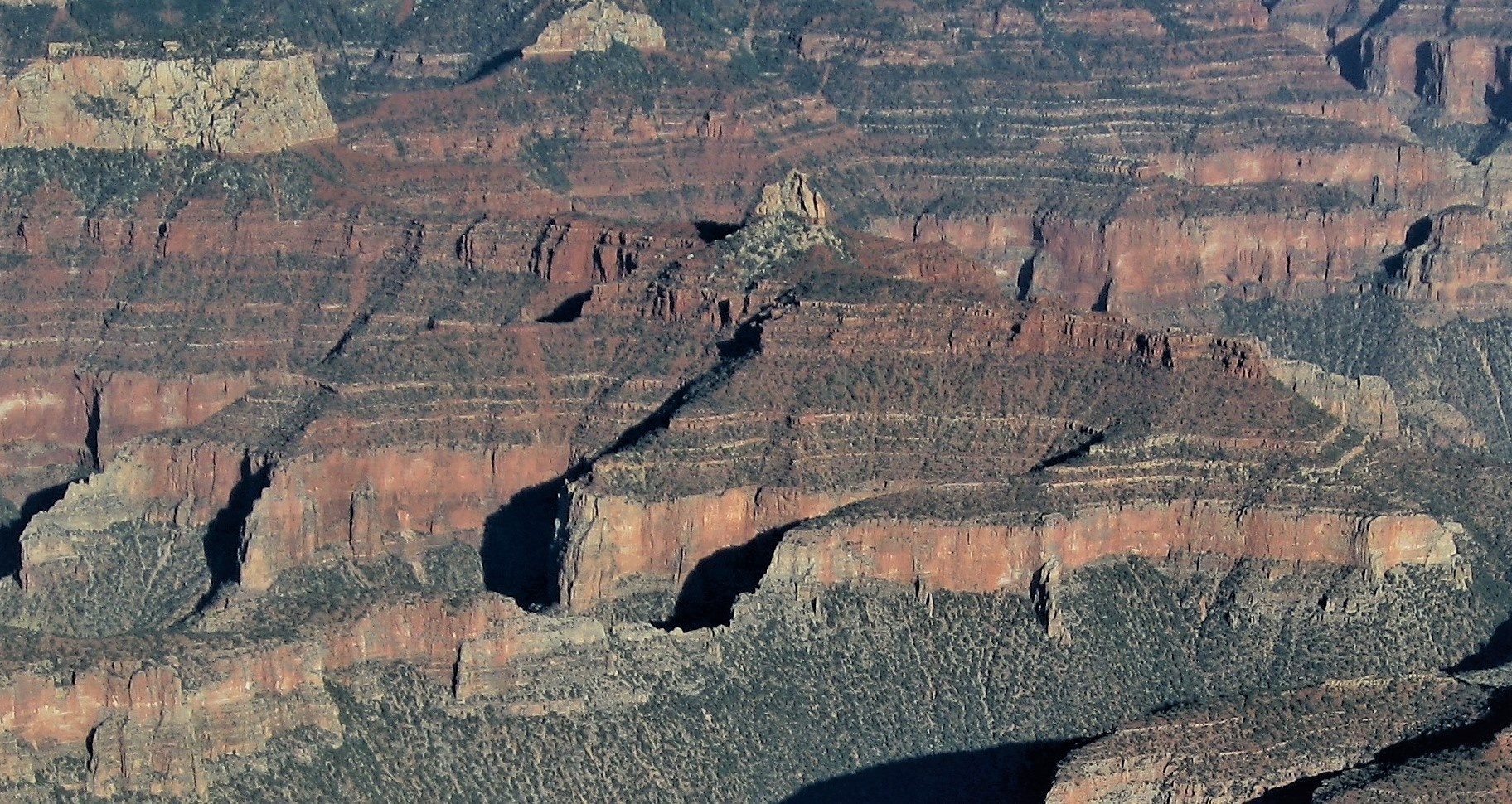
Aerial view looking west, Butchart in bullseye

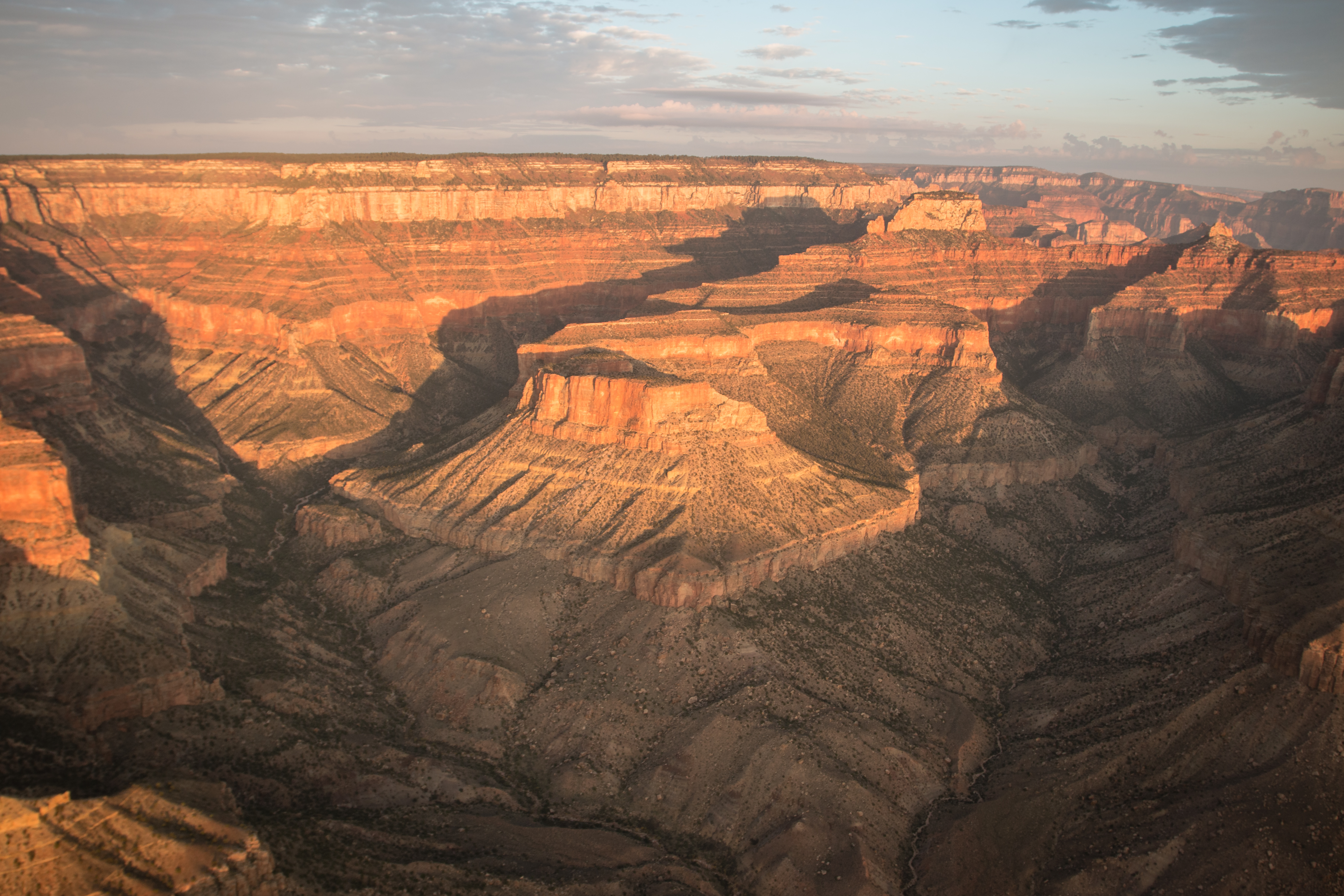
Butchart Butte in upper right

== See also ==
- Geology of the Grand Canyon area
