= Freya Castle =

Landform in the Grand Canyon, Arizona

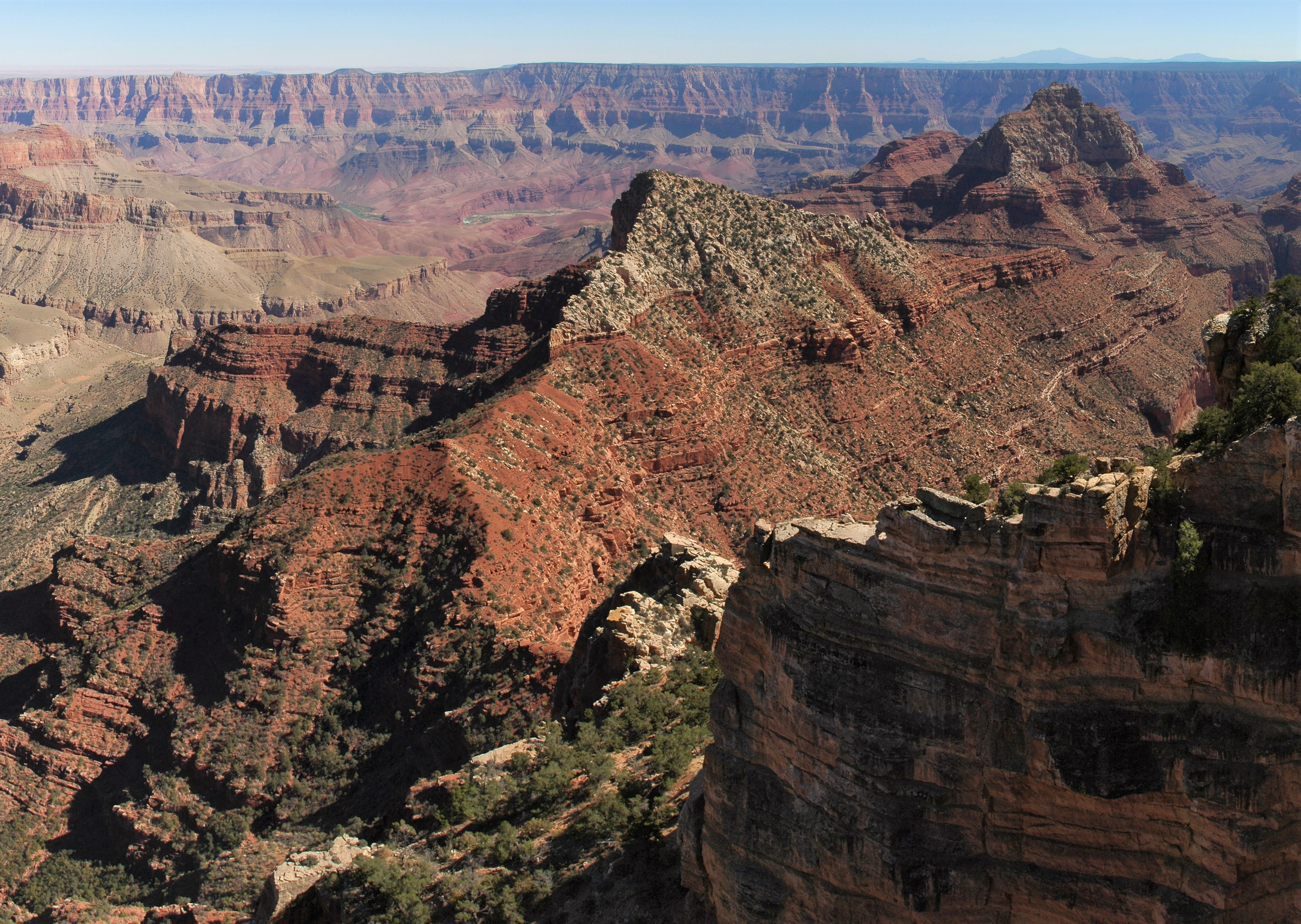
- North aspect, from Angels Window Overlook (Vishnu Temple upper right)

Highest point
- Elevation: 7,288 ft (2,221 m)
- Prominence: 688 ft (210 m)
- Parent peak: Wotans Throne (7,740 ft)
- Isolation: 1.42 mi (2.29 km)
- Coordinates: 36°06′40″N 111°56′11″W

Geography
- Location within Arizona Location within the United States
- Country: United States
- State: Arizona
- County: Coconino
- Protected area: Grand Canyon National Park
- Parent range: Kaibab Plateau; Colorado Plateau
- Topo map: USGS Cape Royal

Geology
- Rock type: Coconino Sandstone

Climbing
- First ascent: 1962
- Easiest route: class 4 climbing

Freya Castle is a 7,288-foot-elevation (2,221-meter) summit located in the Grand Canyon, in Coconino County of northern Arizona, US. It is situated one mile southeast of the Cape Royal overlook on the canyon's North Rim, 1.5 mile north of Vishnu Temple, and 1.7 mile northeast of Wotans Throne. Topographic relief is significant as it rises 3,400 feet (1,000 meters) above the Unkar Valley in one mile.

Freya Castle is named for Freya, the Norse goddess of love, beauty, fertility, sex, war, gold, and seiðr. This name was applied by geologist François E. Matthes, in keeping with Clarence Dutton's practice of naming geographical features in the Grand Canyon after mythological deities. This geographical feature's name was officially adopted in 1906 by the U.S. Board on Geographic Names.

The first ascent of the summit was made by Harvey Butchart and Allyn Cureton on June 24, 1962. According to the Köppen climate classification system, Freya Castle is located in a Cold semi-arid climate zone.

== Geology ==
The summit of Freya Castle is composed of cream-colored Permian Coconino Sandstone. The sandstone, which is the third-youngest of the strata in the Grand Canyon, was deposited 265 million years ago as sand dunes. Below the Coconino Sandstone is soft, slope-forming, Permian Hermit Shale, which in turn overlays the Permian-Pennsylvanian- Supai Group. Further down are strata of Mississippian Redwall Limestone, Cambrian Tonto Group, and finally Proterozoic Unkar Group at creek level. Precipitation runoff from Freya Castle drains south into the Colorado River via Vishnu Creek on its west side, and Unkar Creek on the east side.

== Gallery ==
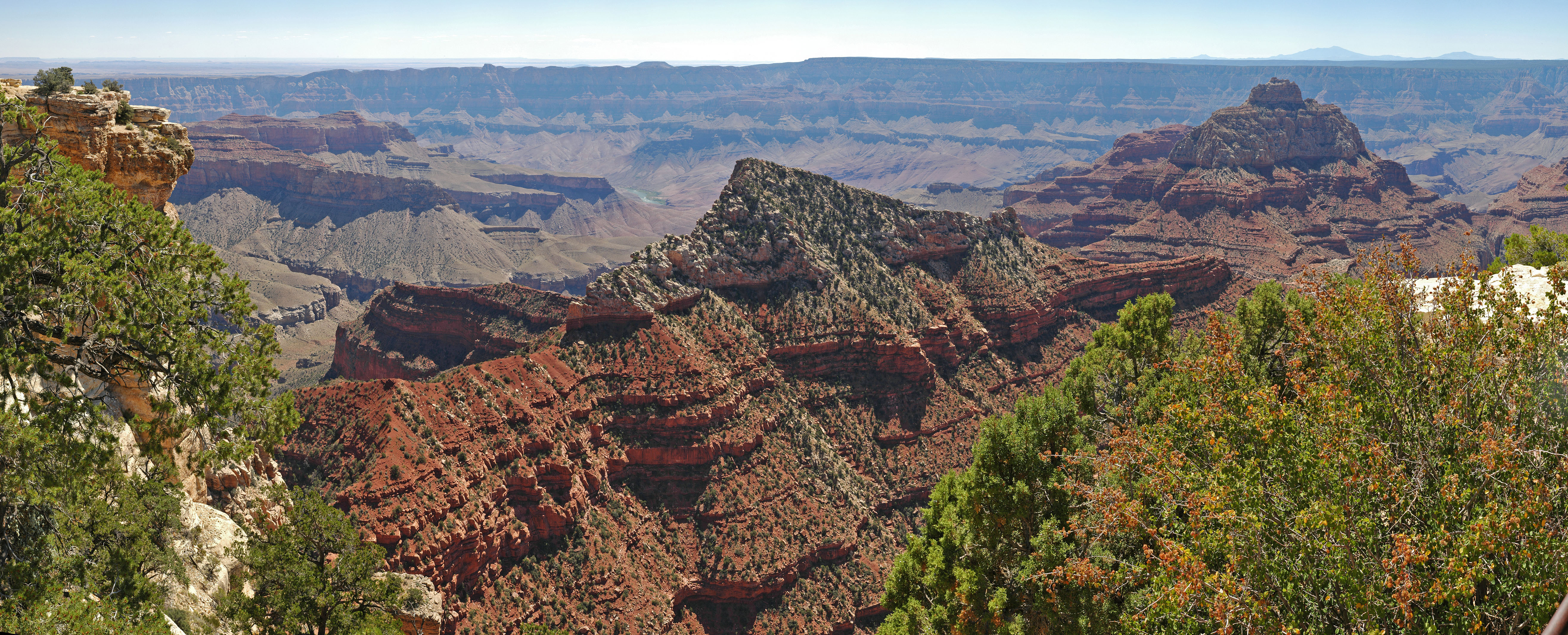
Freya Castle centered, with Vishnu Temple to right, Apollo Temple distant left

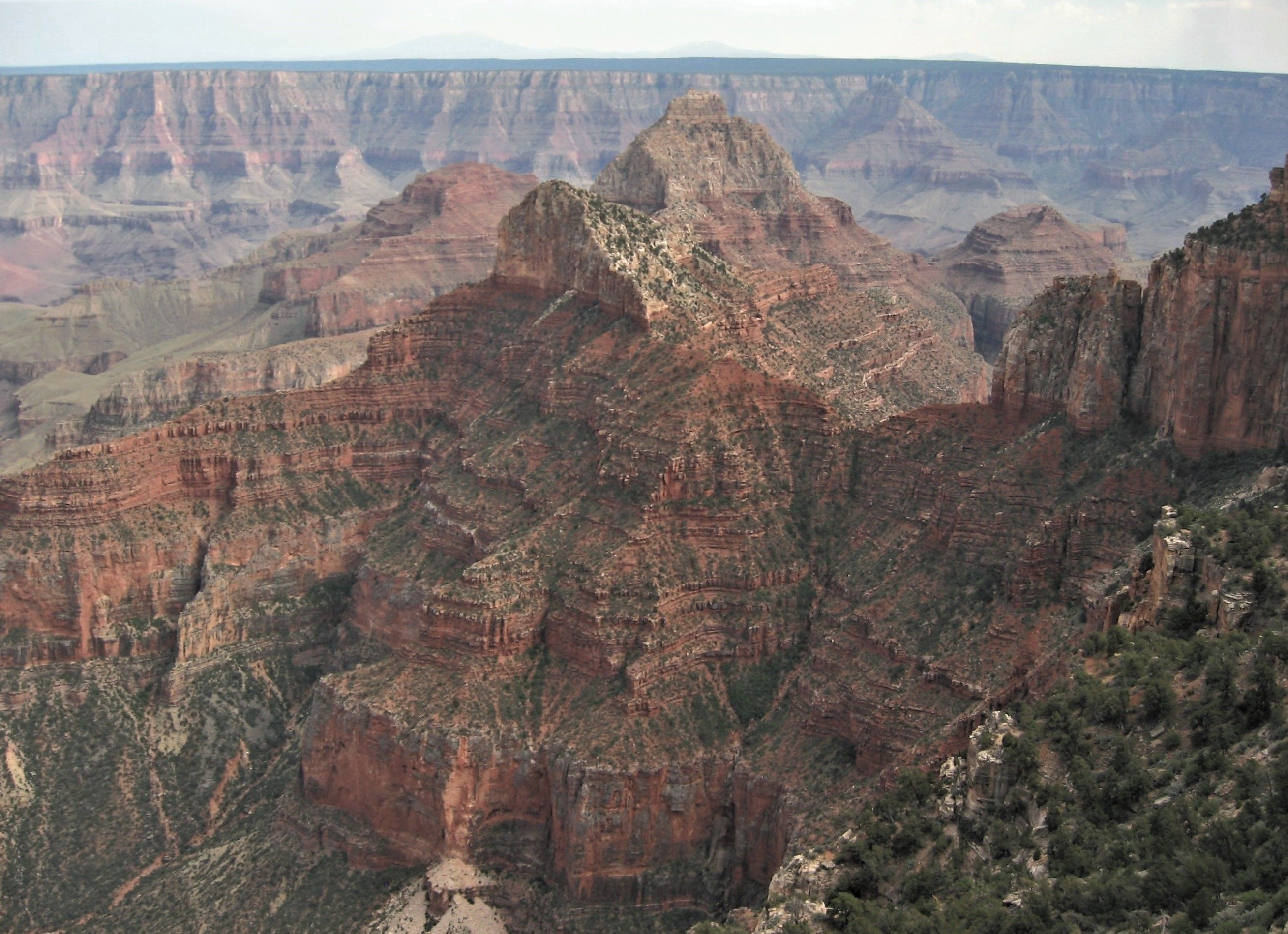
Freya Castle front and center, with Vishnu Temple behind, as seen from Walhalla Overlook.

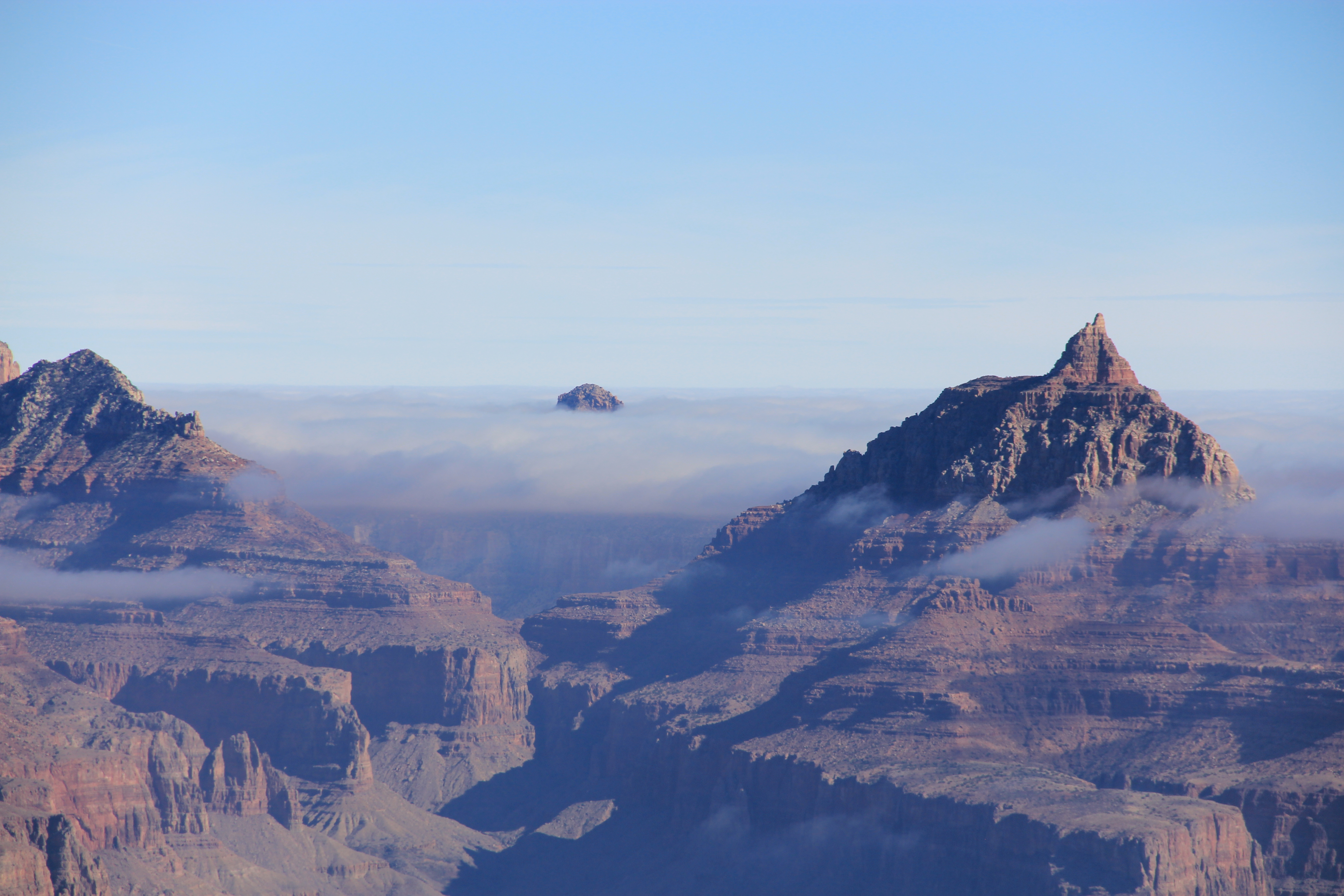
Freya Castle (left), Vishnu Temple (right)

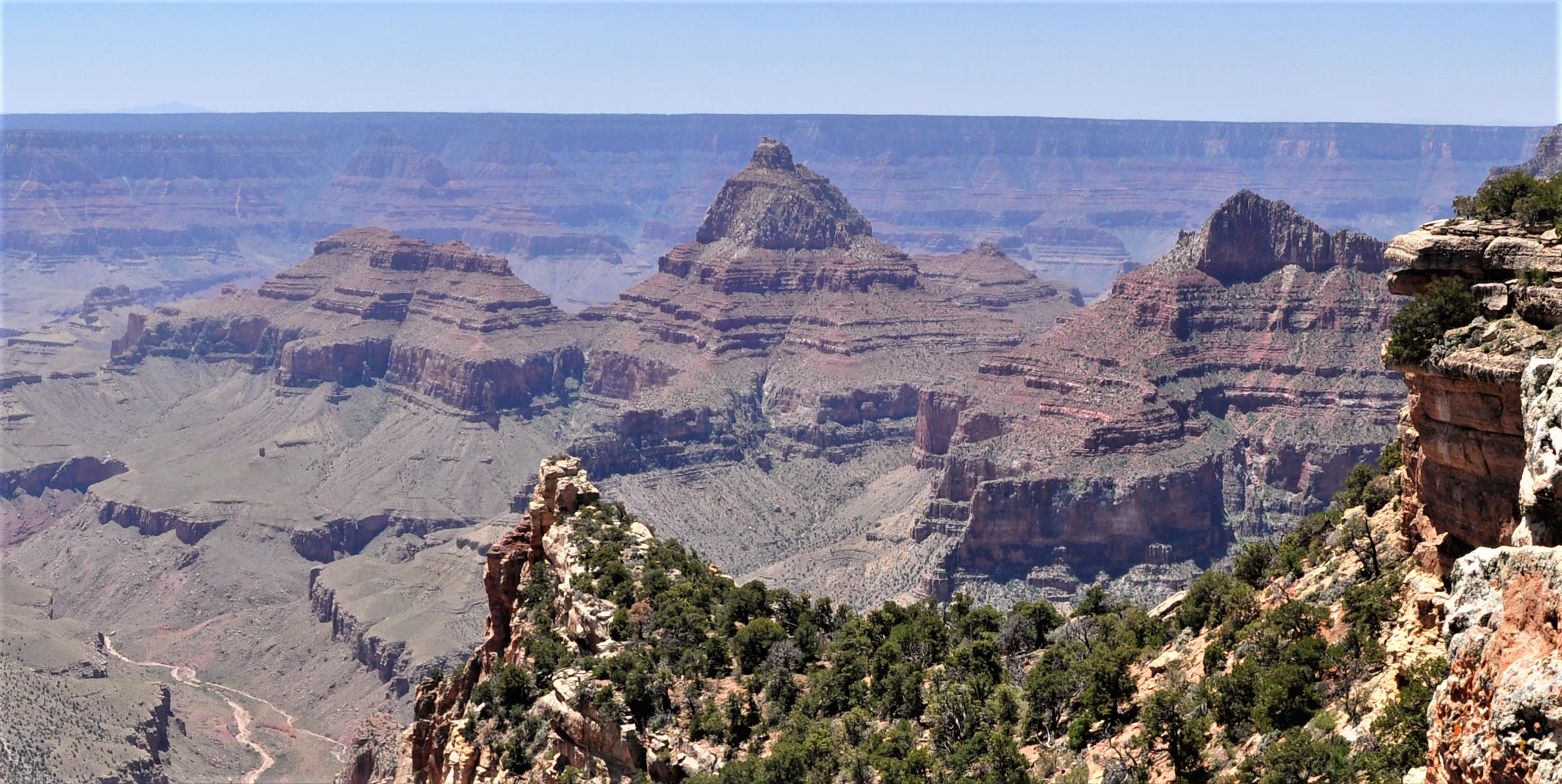
View from northeast at Cape Final.
Left to right: Rama Shrine, Vishnu Temple, Freya Castle

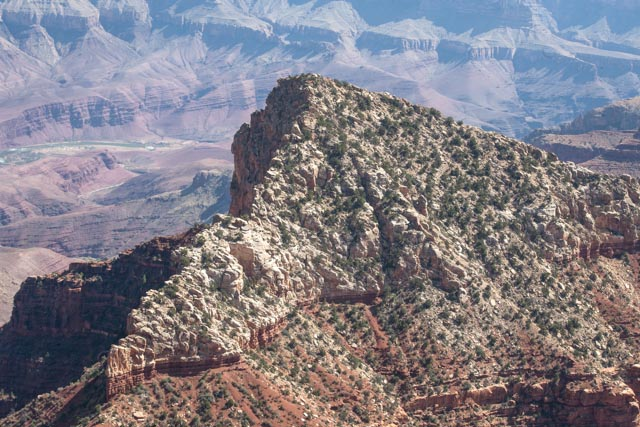
Summit detail

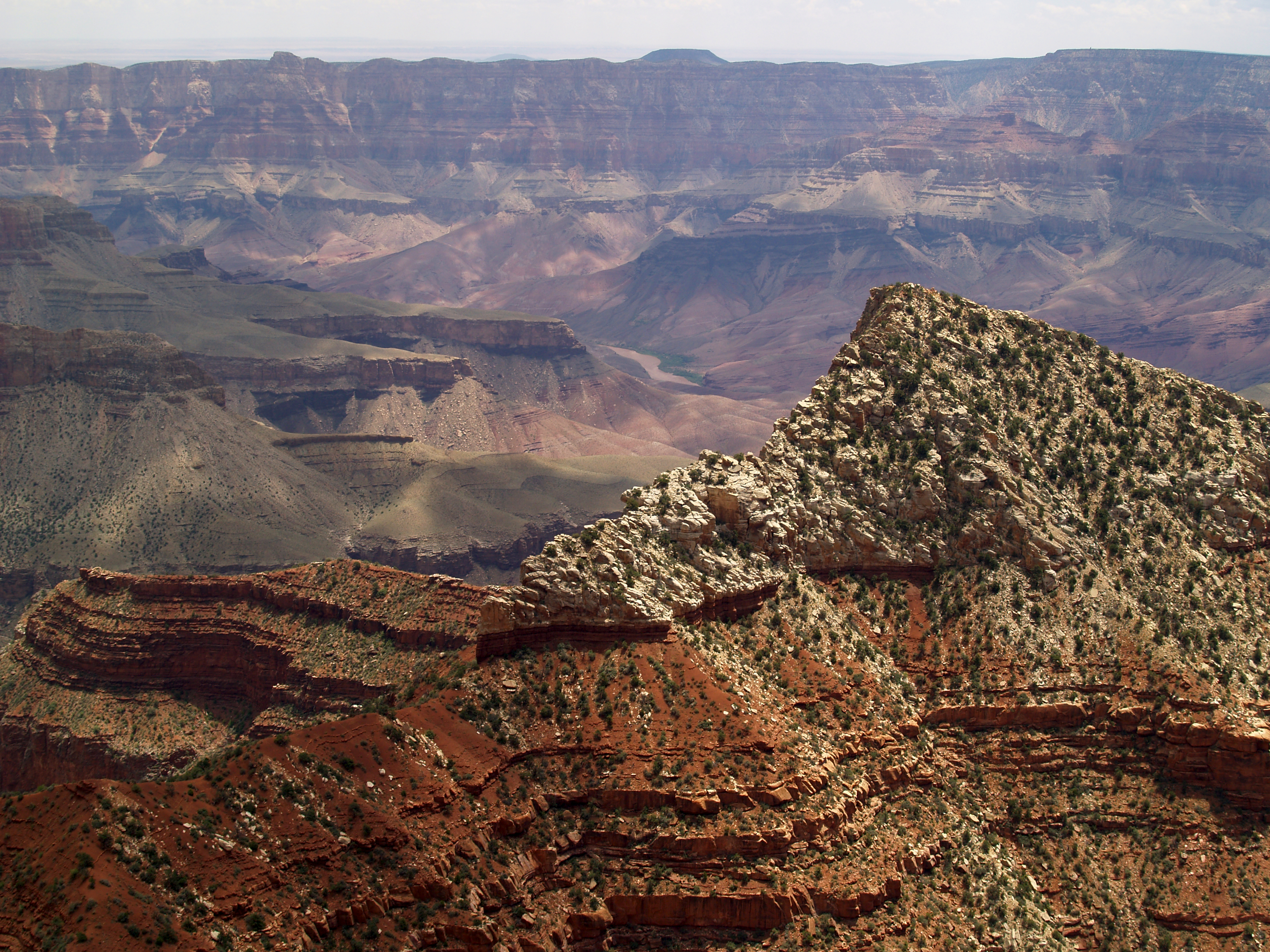
Summit detail

== See also ==
- Geology of the Grand Canyon area
- Cape Royal
