= Juno Temple (Grand Canyon) =

Landform

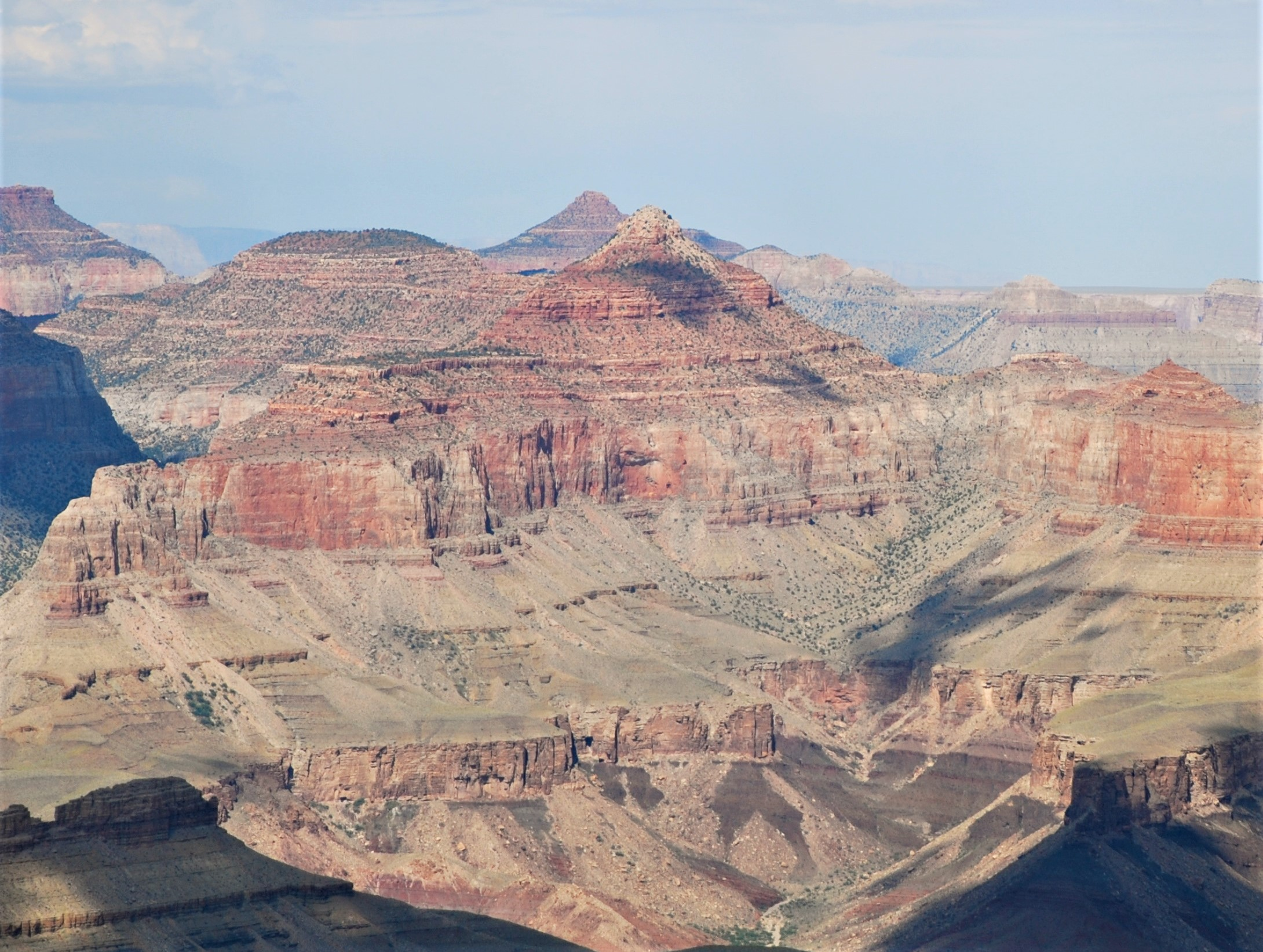
- Jupiter Temple (center) and lower elevation, black-topped ridgeline (left) of Juno Temple

Highest point
- Elevation: 6,896 ft (2,102 m)
- Prominence: 396 ft (121 m)
- Parent peak: Jupiter Temple
- Isolation: 1.08 mi (1.74 km)
- Coordinates: 36.1504°N 111.8917°W

Geography
- Location within Arizona Location within the United States
- Location: Grand Canyon National Park; Coconino County, Arizona, US
- Parent range: Kaibab Plateau (Walhalla Plateau); Colorado Plateau
- Topo map: USGS Walhalla Plateau

Geology
- Rock age: Pennsylvanian down to Cambrian
- Mountain type(s): sedimentary rock: sandstone-(prominence-cliff), siltstone, mudstone, sandstone, shale
- Rock type(s): Supai Group, Redwall Limestone, Muav Limestone, Bright Angel Shale

Climbing
- First ascent: September 3, 1961 Harvey Butchart

Juno Temple is a 6,896-elevation summit located in the eastern Grand Canyon, in Coconino County of northern Arizona, United States. It is located 1.5 miles east-northeast of the Cape Final overlook, and is about 1.0 mi north of Jupiter Temple, its nearest high neighbor. It also lies about 3.5 miles from the Colorado River, at the headwaters of the Basalt Creek and Canyon watershed, its major drainage on its east flank.

Unlike its Jupiter Temple neighbor which has a prominence of Coconino Sandstone on a long ridgeline, Juno Temple is a ridgeline of eroded Supai Group, and is stained dark, unlike the often bright, orange-reds of the common Supai Group “redbeds”.
