= Siegfried Pyre =

Landform in the Grand Canyon

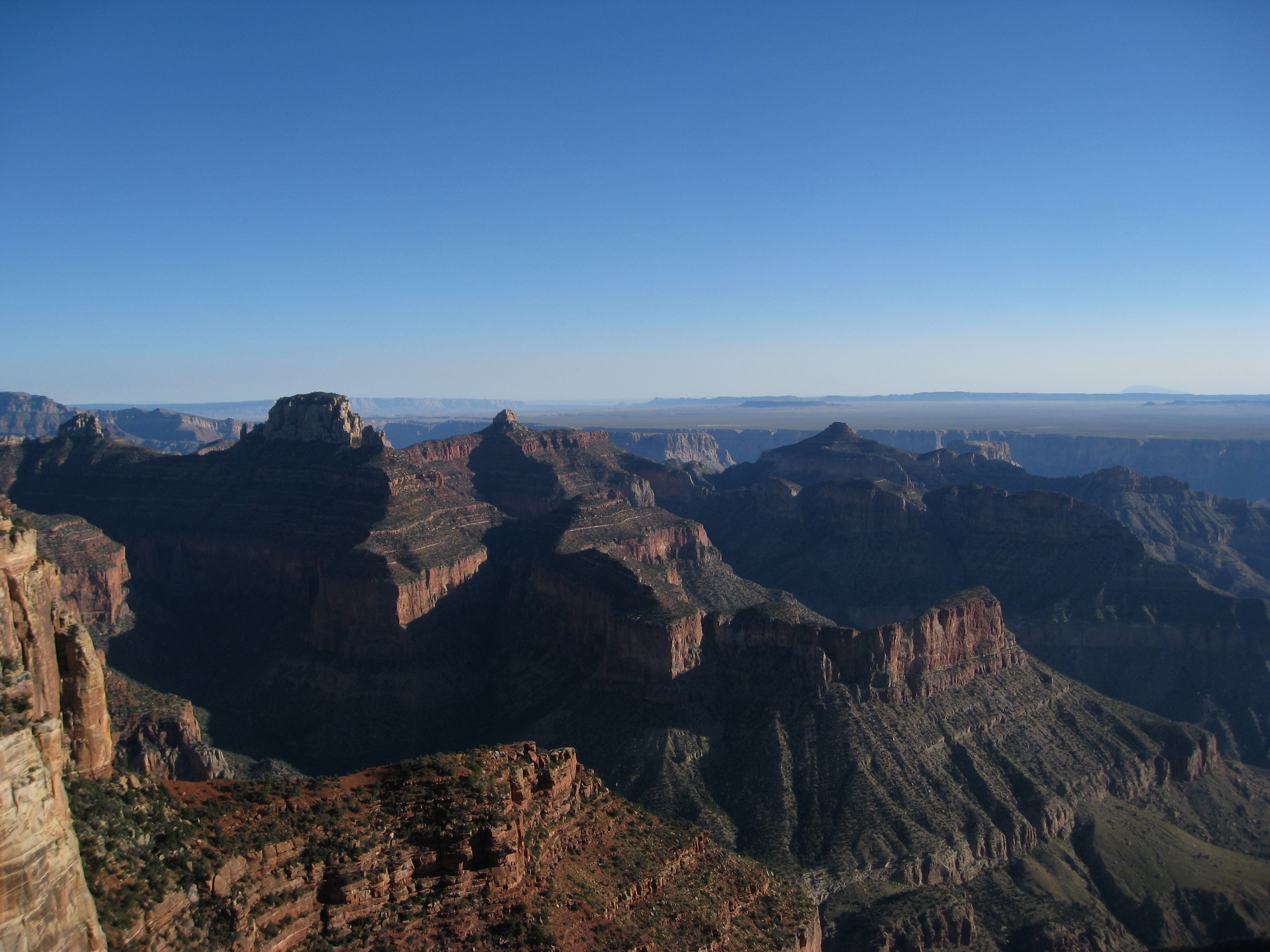

Highest point
- Elevation: 7,922 ft (2,415 m)
- Prominence: 832 ft (254 m)
- Parent peak: Brady Peak
- Isolation: 4.43 mi (7.13 km)
- Coordinates: 36.1972°N 111.9080°W

Geography
- Location within Arizona Location within the United States
- Location: Grand Canyon National Park; Coconino County, Arizona, US
- Parent range: Kaibab Plateau (Walhalla Plateau); Colorado Plateau
- Topo map: USGS Walhalla Plateau

Geology
- Rock age: Permian down to Cambrian
- Mountain type(s): sedimentary rock: sandstone-(prominence-cliff), siltstone, mudstone, sandstone, shale
- Rock type(s): Toroweap Formation-(debris remainder), Coconino Sandstone, Hermit Shale, Supai Group, Redwall Limestone, Muav Limestone, Bright Angel Shale

Siegfried Pyre is a 7,922-foot (2,415 m)-elevation summit located in the eastern Grand Canyon, in Coconino County of northern Arizona, United States. It is situated adjacent to the eastern North Rim, specifically, to the east face of the Walhalla Plateau. It is southeast of Atoko Point and northeast of Naji Point. One of its nearest neighbors is Mount Hayden, as well as Brady Peak.

Because the peak is close to the east face of the Walhalla Plateau, it happens to be at the headwaters of three drainages to the Colorado River, the Kwagunt Creek, north-then-east, the Lava Creek drainage, south-then-east, and the Chuar Creek drainage, southeast-then-east.

== See also ==
- Geology of the Grand Canyon area
- Swilling Butte
- Butchart Butte
- Hubbell Butte
