= Jupiter Temple =

Landform in the Grand Canyon, Arizona

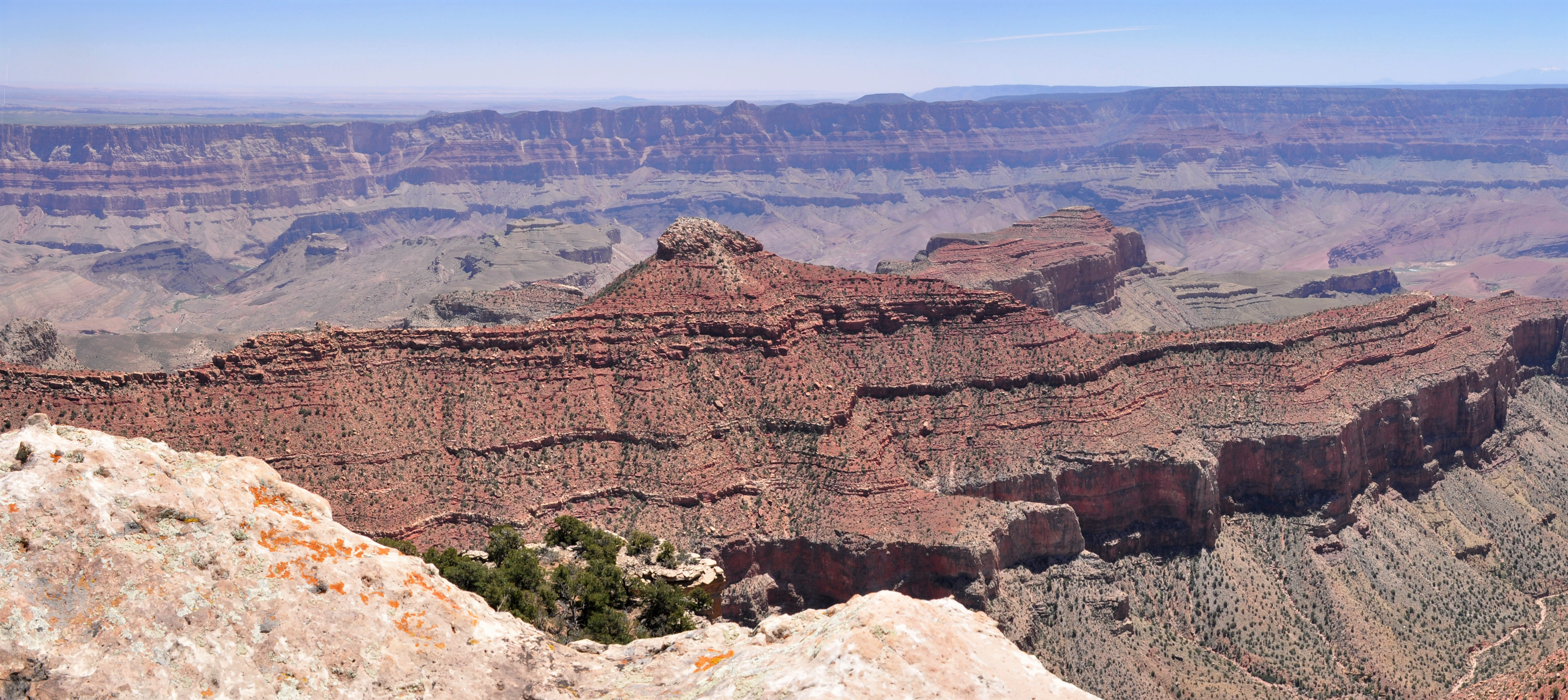
- West aspect, from Cape Final

Highest point
- Elevation: 7,084 ft (2,159 m)
- Prominence: 1,072 ft (327 m)
- Parent peak: Freya Castle (7,288 ft)
- Isolation: 3.06 mi (4.92 km)
- Coordinates: 36°08′05″N 111°53′24″W

Geography
- Location within Arizona Location within the United States
- Country: United States
- State: Arizona
- County: Coconino
- Protected area: Grand Canyon National Park
- Parent range: Kaibab Plateau; Colorado Plateau
- Topo map: USGS Walhalla Plateau

Geology
- Rock type(s): sandstone, siltstone, limestone

Jupiter Temple is a 7,084-foot (2,159 m)-elevation summit located in the Grand Canyon, in Coconino County of northern Arizona, United States. It is situated one mile (1.6 km) southeast of Cape Final on the canyon's North Rim, one point five miles (2.4 km) north-northwest of Apollo Temple, and three miles (4.8 km) northeast of Freya Castle, which is the nearest higher peak. Topographic relief is significant as it rises 4,400 feet (1,300 m) above the Colorado River in less than four miles (6.4 km).

Jupiter Temple is named for Jupiter, supreme deity in Roman mythology, in keeping with Clarence Dutton's tradition of naming geographical features in the Grand Canyon after mythological deities. This feature's name was officially adopted in 1906 by the U.S. Board on Geographic Names. According to the Köppen climate classification system, Jupiter Temple is located in a cold semi-arid climate zone.

== Geology ==
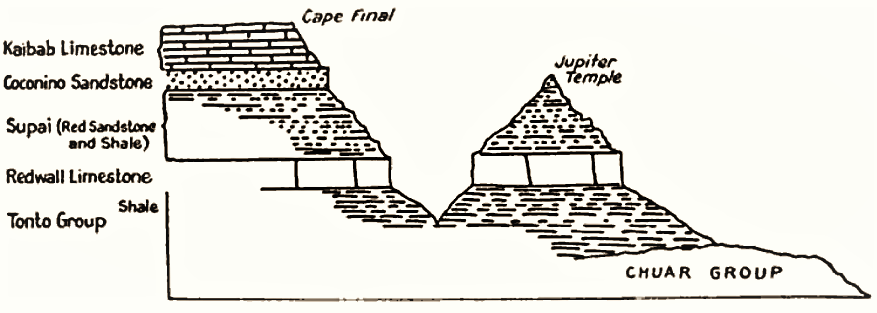
Jupiter Temple strata

The summit of Jupiter Temple is a cupola of remnant Permian Coconino Sandstone overlaying strata of the Pennsylvanian-Permian Supai Group. This in turn overlays the cliff-forming layer of Mississippian Redwall Limestone, which in turn overlays Cambrian Tonto Group, and finally Neoproterozoic Chuar Group at river level. Precipitation runoff from Jupiter Temple drains south to the Colorado River via Basalt and Unkar Creeks.

== See also ==
- Geology of the Grand Canyon area

== Gallery ==
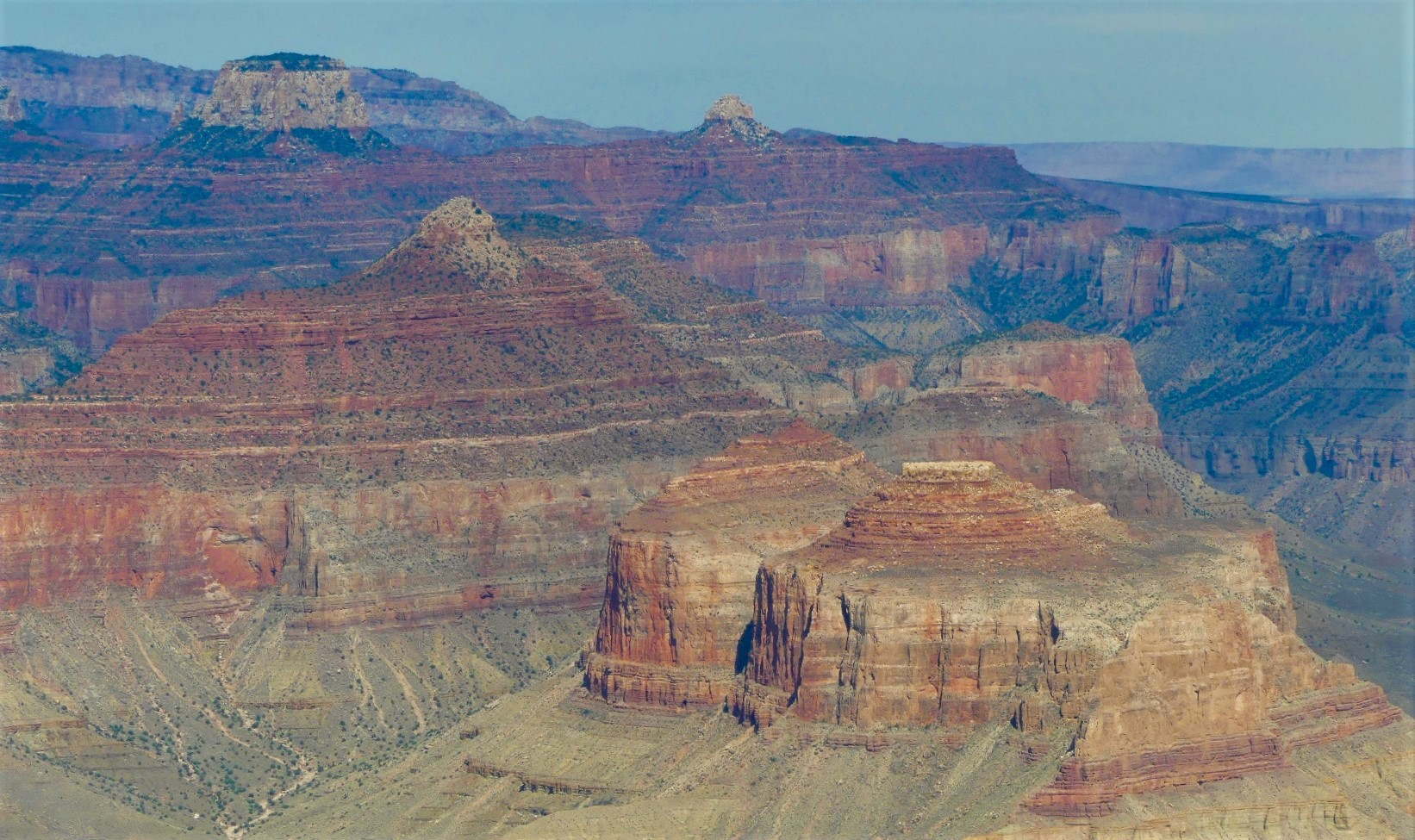
Aerial view of Jupiter Temple (left), Siegfried Pyre (upper left corner), and Apollo Temple (lower right). In Roman mythology, Apollo is Jupiter's son.

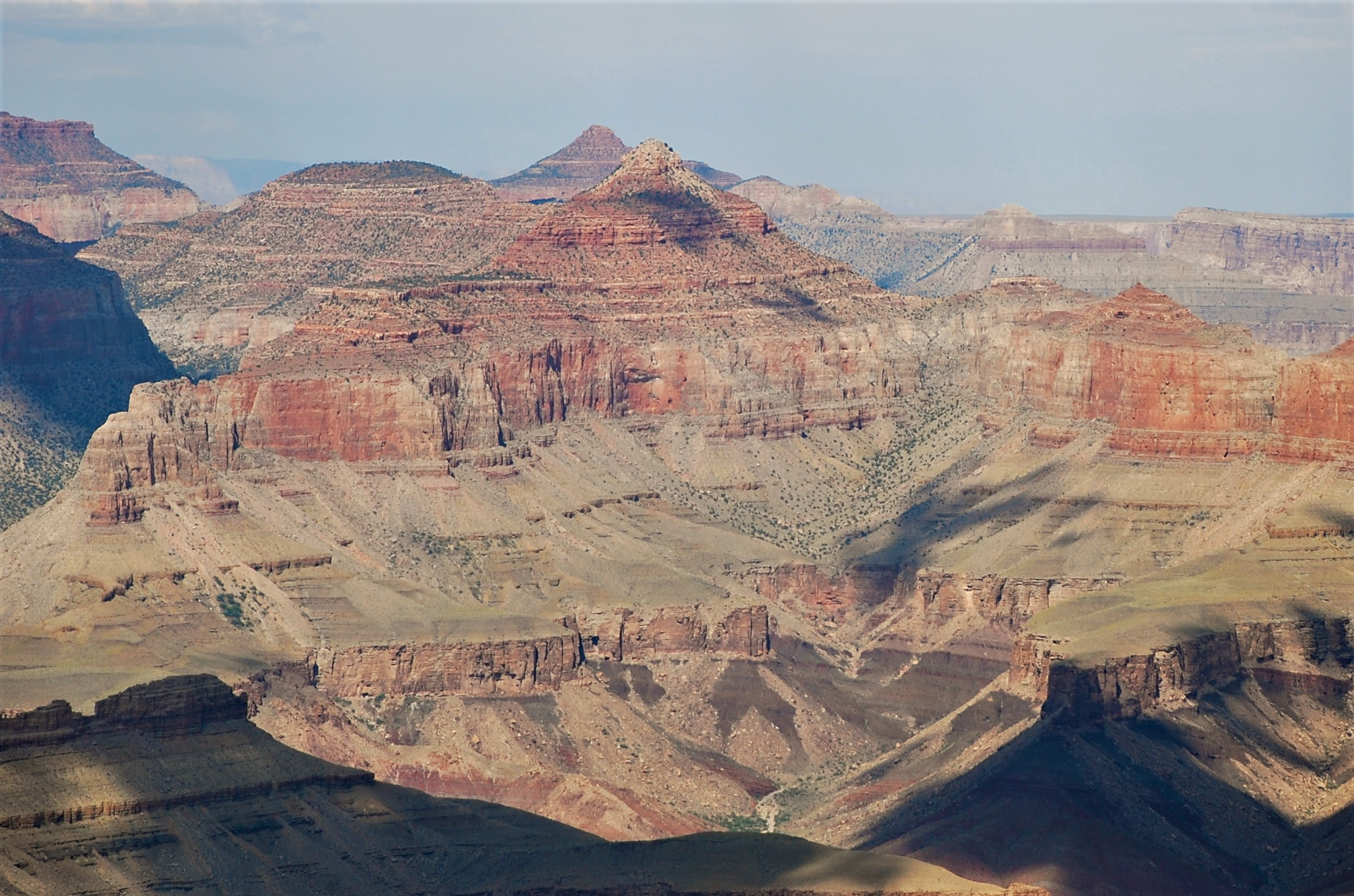
Jupiter Temple from South Rim

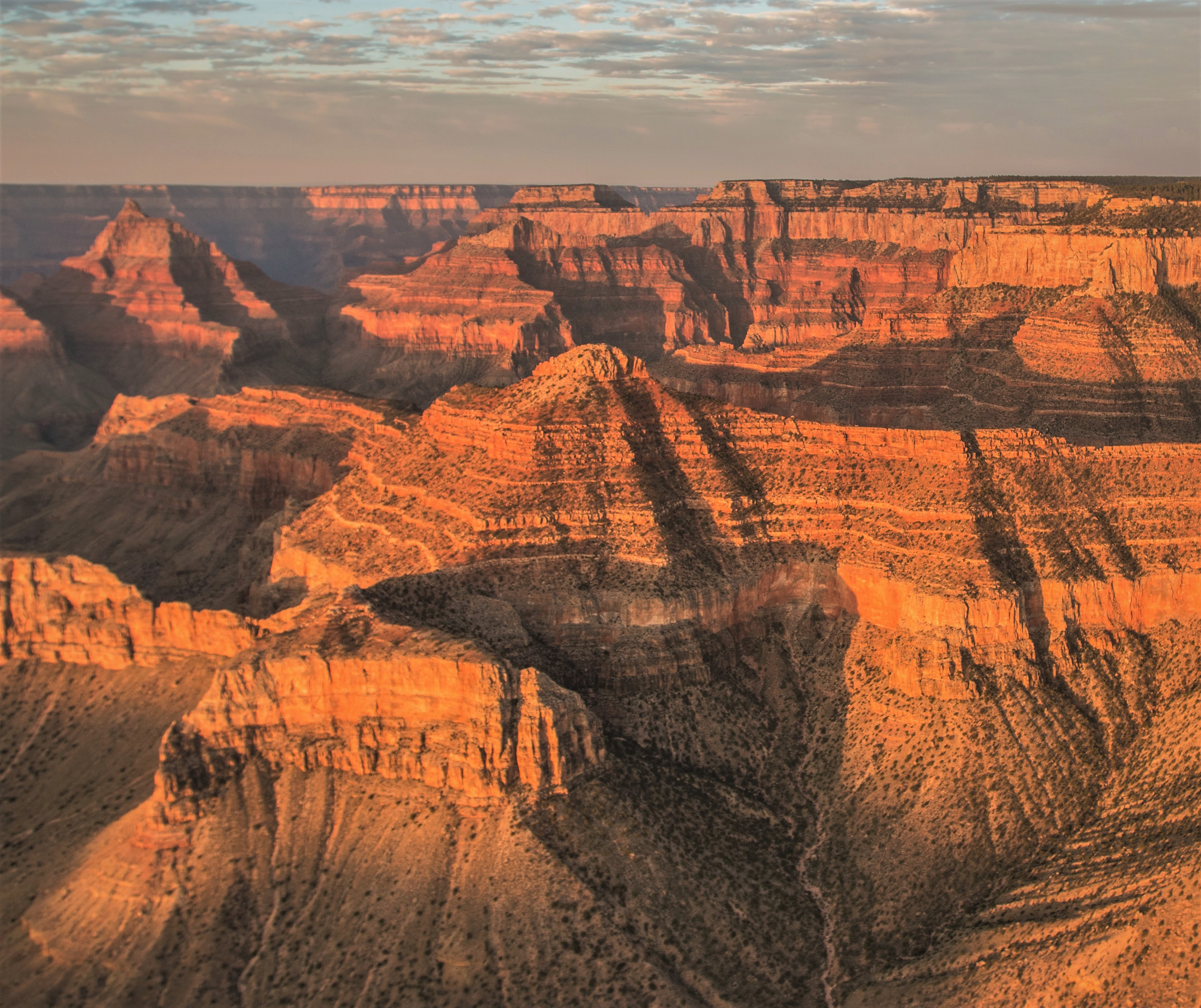
Aerial view of Jupiter Temple (centered), northeast aspect
