= Harvey Butchart =

American hiker and mathematician (1907–2002)

- Born: May 10, 1907; Hefei, Anhui, China
- Died: May 29, 2002 (aged 95)
- Education: Eureka College (BS); University of Illinois (MS, PhD)
- Occupations: Hiker mathematician

John Harvey Butchart (May 10, 1907 – May 29, 2002) was an American hiker and mathematician who was well known for his exploits in and around the Grand Canyon in Arizona, United States. Beginning in 1945, Butchart explored the Grand Canyon's backcountry on foot. He wrote extensively about his adventures and influenced generations of canyoneers.

== Family and academic career ==
Butchart was born in Hefei, China, in Anhui Province to missionary parents. After his father died, the family moved in 1920 to Vermont, Illinois, and later to Eureka, Illinois. Butchart graduated from Eureka College in 1928 and received a master's and PhD from the University of Illinois in 1929 and 1932, respectively. He married Roma Wilson in 1929, and they raised two children. He taught mathematics at several Midwest colleges. After three years at Grinnell College, the family moved to Flagstaff in 1945 to help cure their daughter's hay fever.

Butchart taught mathematics at Arizona State College (now known as Northern Arizona University) from 1945 until retiring in 1976. He was sponsor of the school's hiking club for 12 years and a chair of the Mathematics Department.

== Explorations ==
Upon moving to Flagstaff in 1945, he began exploring the Grand Canyon. After hiking most of the main routes, he began to explore unofficial routes, old Native American trails, and even animal trails. His mentors included Merrel Clubb and Emery Kolb. He sometimes hiked alone but most often traveled with friends and students. In contrast to his predecessors, Butchart kept a detailed log of his explorations, which would eventually reach more than 1,000 pages. He recorded 1,024 days spent in the Canyon, and over 12,000 miles (19,000 km) walked. He climbed 83 summits within the Canyon, and scaled the walls at 164 places, claiming 25 first ascents. He was credited with discovering over 100 rim-to-river routes within the Canyon.

By 1963 Butchart was the acknowledged expert on backcountry hiking. In multiple trips over several years, he had completed the first route from one end of the national park to the other, except for about four miles below Great Thumb and Tahuta Points. Colin Fletcher relied heavily on Butchart's knowledge to plan his own hike through the whole park in a single journey later that year. Fletcher wrote:

Today, Harvey Butchart is a compact, coiled-spring fifty-five – and a happy and devoted schizophrenic. Teaching mathematics is only one of his worlds. At intervals he lives in a quite different reality. His three-year-old grandson, a young man of perception, recently heard someone use the words “Grand Canyon.” “Where Grandpa lives?“ he asked, just to make sure.

Beginning in 1970, Butchart published three slim volumes of trail notes from his exploration records. He continued hiking until 1987. In 1998, the books were republished in one volume with additional new material. Butchart's famously cryptic texts were written for those developing the strength and skill to hike safely in the most remote areas. They focus largely on routes to pass through the major cliff lines and to find water sources. For many of the routes, his texts are the only published references.

Butchart was interviewed many times as his fame grew, for example in 1994. A 2007 biography tells his story and that of foot exploration in the Grand Canyon.

Butchart donated a large amount of material to Northern Arizona University. The collection includes more than 1,000 pages of his original trail logs, 52 hiking maps with handwritten annotations, more than 7,000 color slide photographs, extensive correspondence, and related publications. The collection and guide were reorganized in 2020.

In 2009, the US Board on Geographic Names honored Harvey Butchart by naming a 7,600-foot butte within Grand Canyon National Park "Butchart Butte" (36.204°N 111.897°W). The butte is east of the Walhalla Plateau in the eastern area of the national park. On the North Rim it can be seen from Pt. Imperial (7 miles southeast), or on the South Rim from Desert View (12 miles north-northwest). It is 1.5 miles west of Gunther Castle along the divide between Kwagunt and Chuar Valleys but not specifically mentioned in his route guides.
