= Apollo Temple =

Landform in the Grand Canyon, Arizona

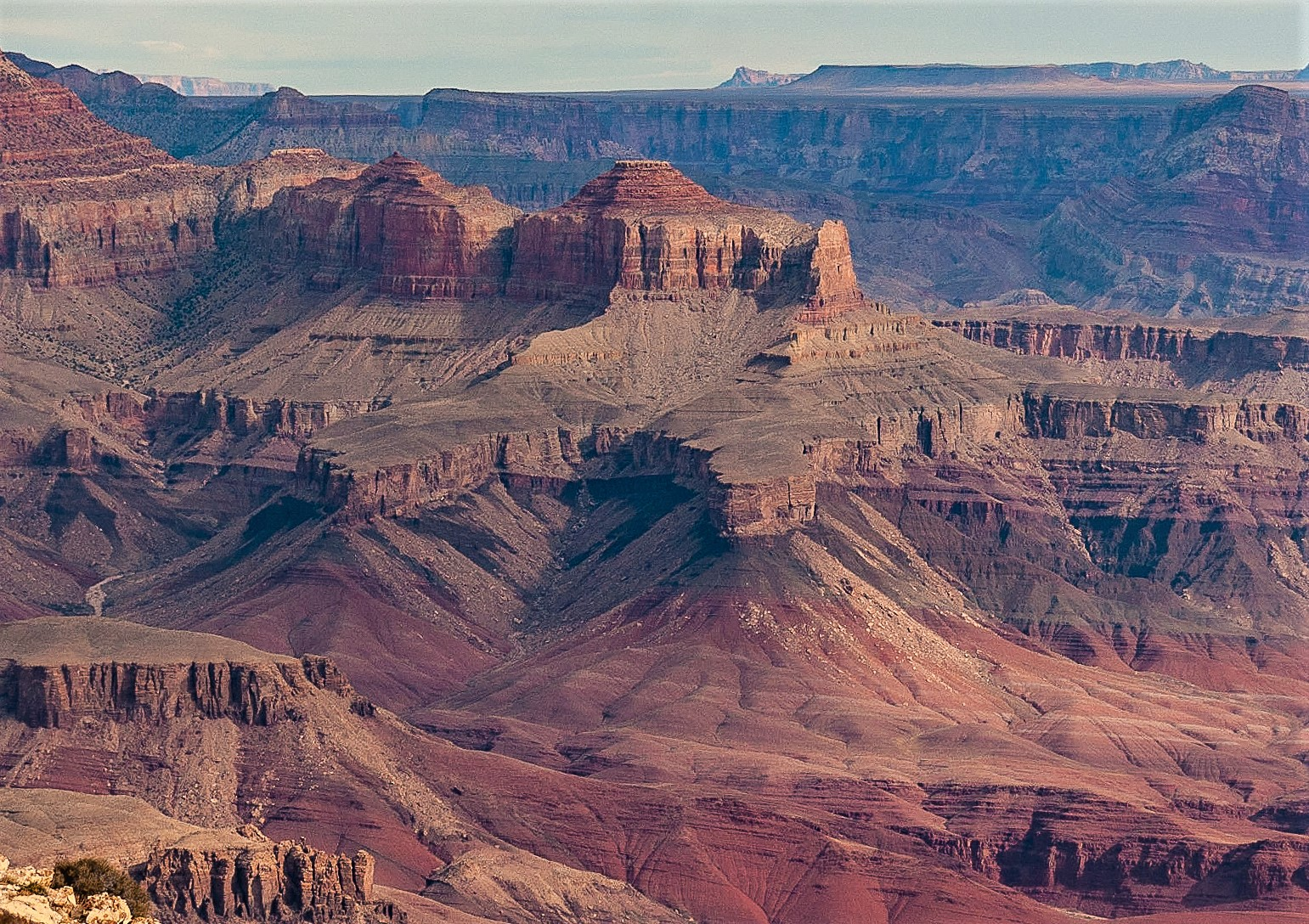
- South aspect, from Moran Point

Highest point
- Elevation: 6,252 ft (1,906 m)
- Prominence: 432 ft (132 m)
- Parent peak: Venus Temple (6,281 ft)
- Isolation: 0.59 mi (0.95 km)
- Coordinates: 36°06′56″N 111°52′48″W

Geography
- Location within Arizona Location within the United States
- Country: United States
- State: Arizona
- County: Coconino
- Protected area: Grand Canyon National Park
- Parent range: Kaibab Plateau; Colorado Plateau
- Topo map: USGS Cape Royal

Geology
- Rock type(s): sandstone, siltstone, limestone

Apollo Temple is a 6,252-foot-elevation (1,906-meter) summit located in the Grand Canyon, in Coconino County of northern Arizona, in the southwestern United States. It is situated four miles due east of Cape Royal on the canyon's North Rim, four miles northeast of Vishnu Temple, and a half-mile south-southeast of Venus Temple, which is the nearest higher neighbor. Topographic relief is significant as it rises over 3,600 feet (1,100 meters) above the Colorado River in less than two miles.

Apollo Temple is named for Apollo, god of the sun in Greek and Roman mythology. This name was applied in 1902 by geologist François E. Matthes, in keeping with Clarence Dutton's tradition of naming geographical features in the Grand Canyon after mythological deities. This feature's name was officially adopted in 1906 by the U.S. Board on Geographic Names.

The top of Apollo Temple is composed of lower strata of the Pennsylvanian-Permian Supai Group. This overlays the cliff-forming layer of Mississippian Redwall Limestone, which in turn overlays Cambrian Tonto Group. According to the Köppen climate classification system, Apollo Temple is located in a Cold semi-arid climate zone. Precipitation runoff from Apollo Temple drains south to the Colorado River via Unkar and Basalt Creeks.

== See also ==
- Geology of the Grand Canyon area
- Grand Canyon Supergroup
- Venus Temple
- Ochoa Point

== Gallery ==
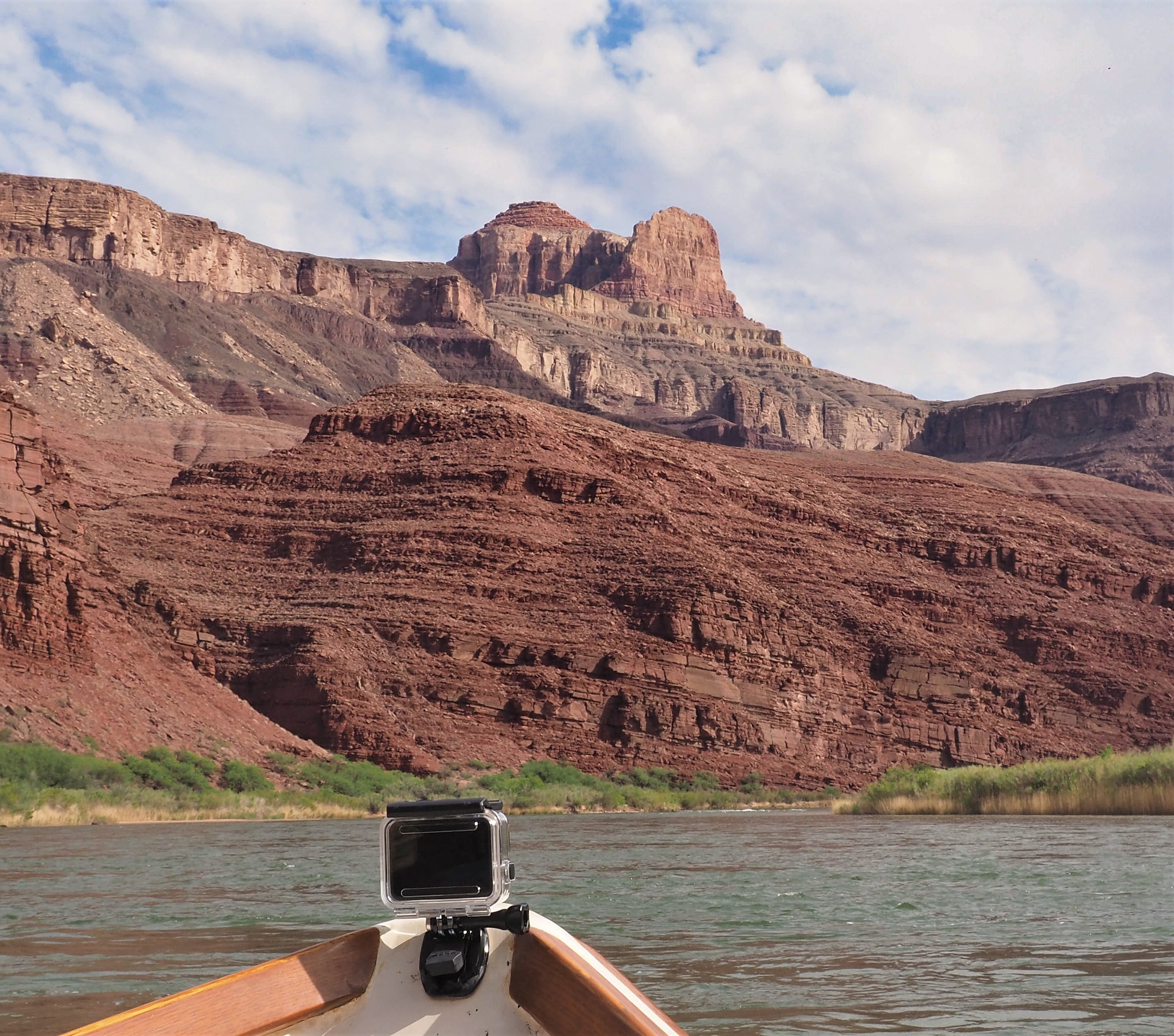
Apollo Temple seen from Colorado River

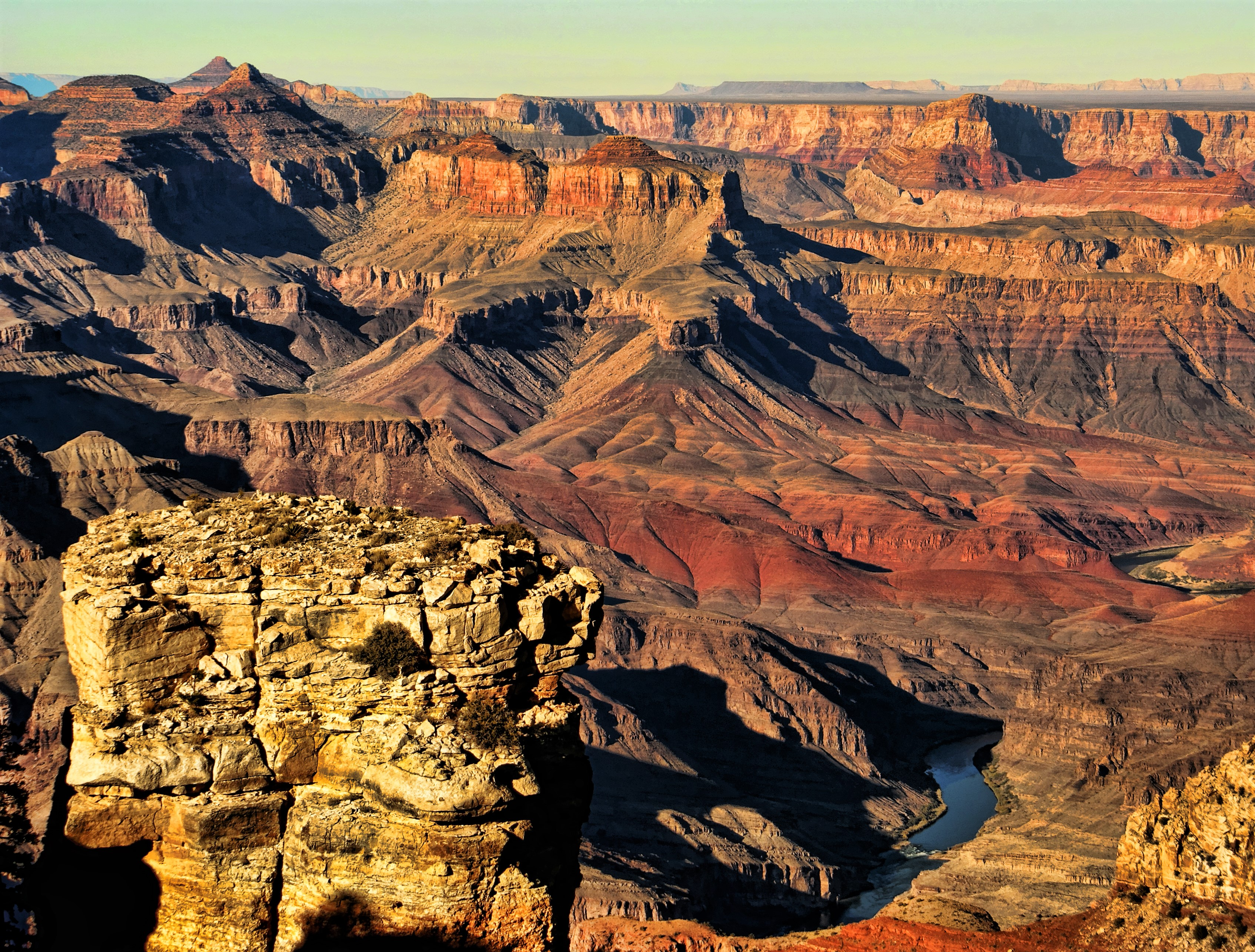
Apollo Temple centered

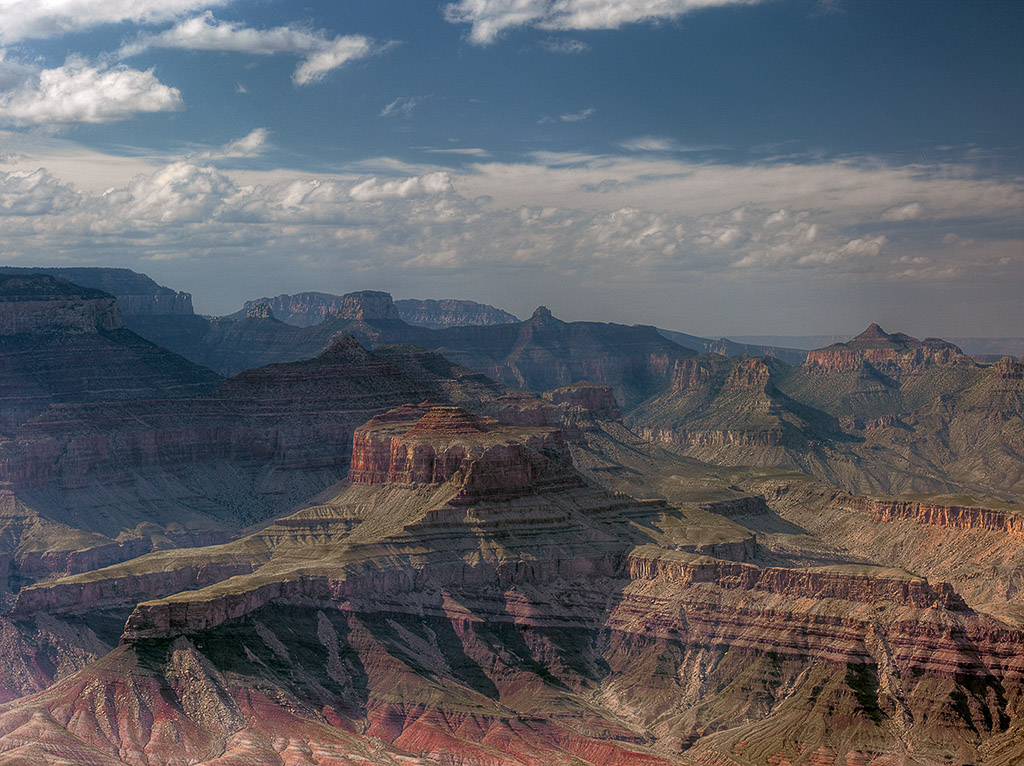
View from Lipan Point with Apollo Temple centered, Jupiter Temple behind left, and Gunther Castle upper right

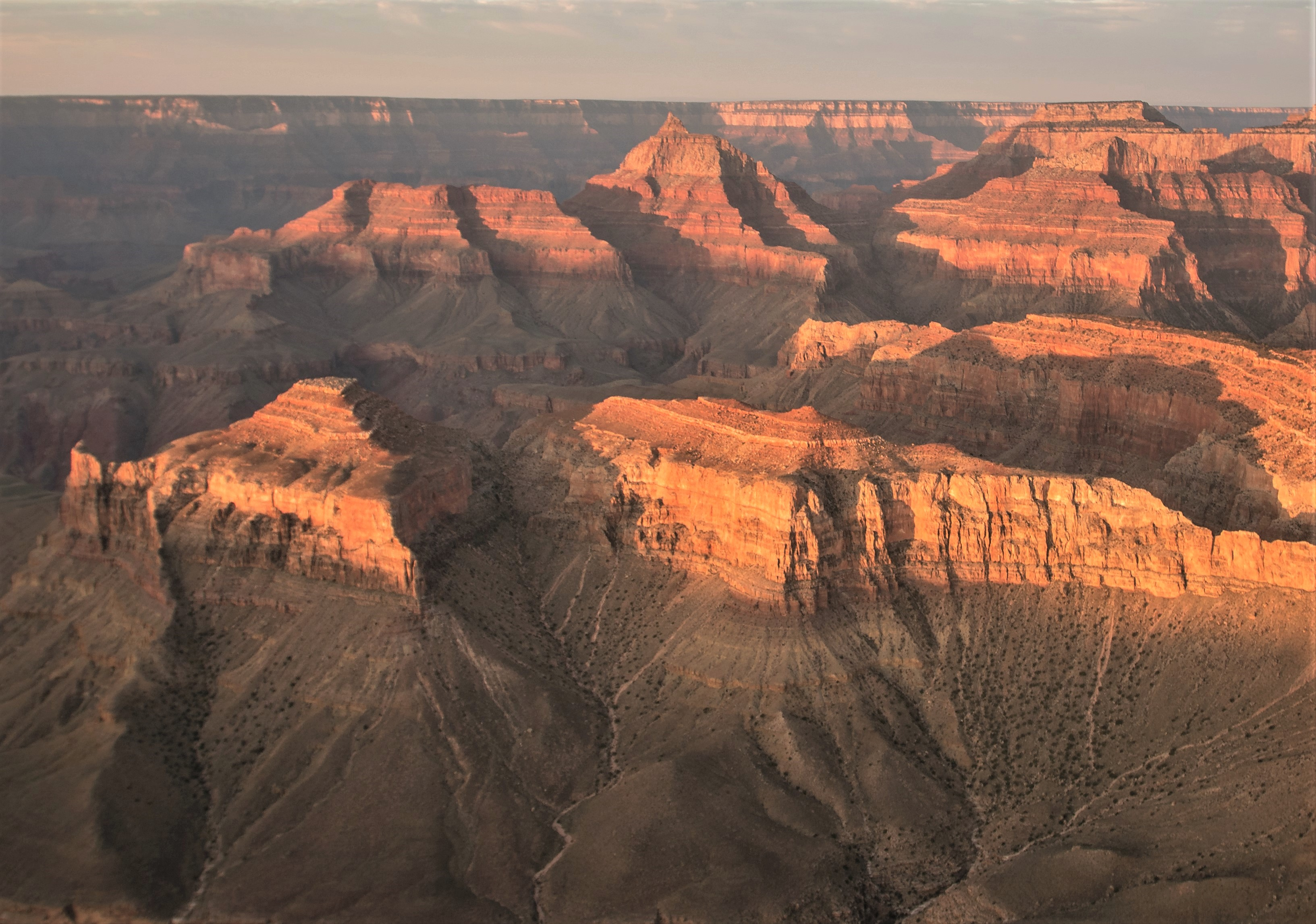
Apollo Temple lower left, Venus Temple lower right. Aerial view.

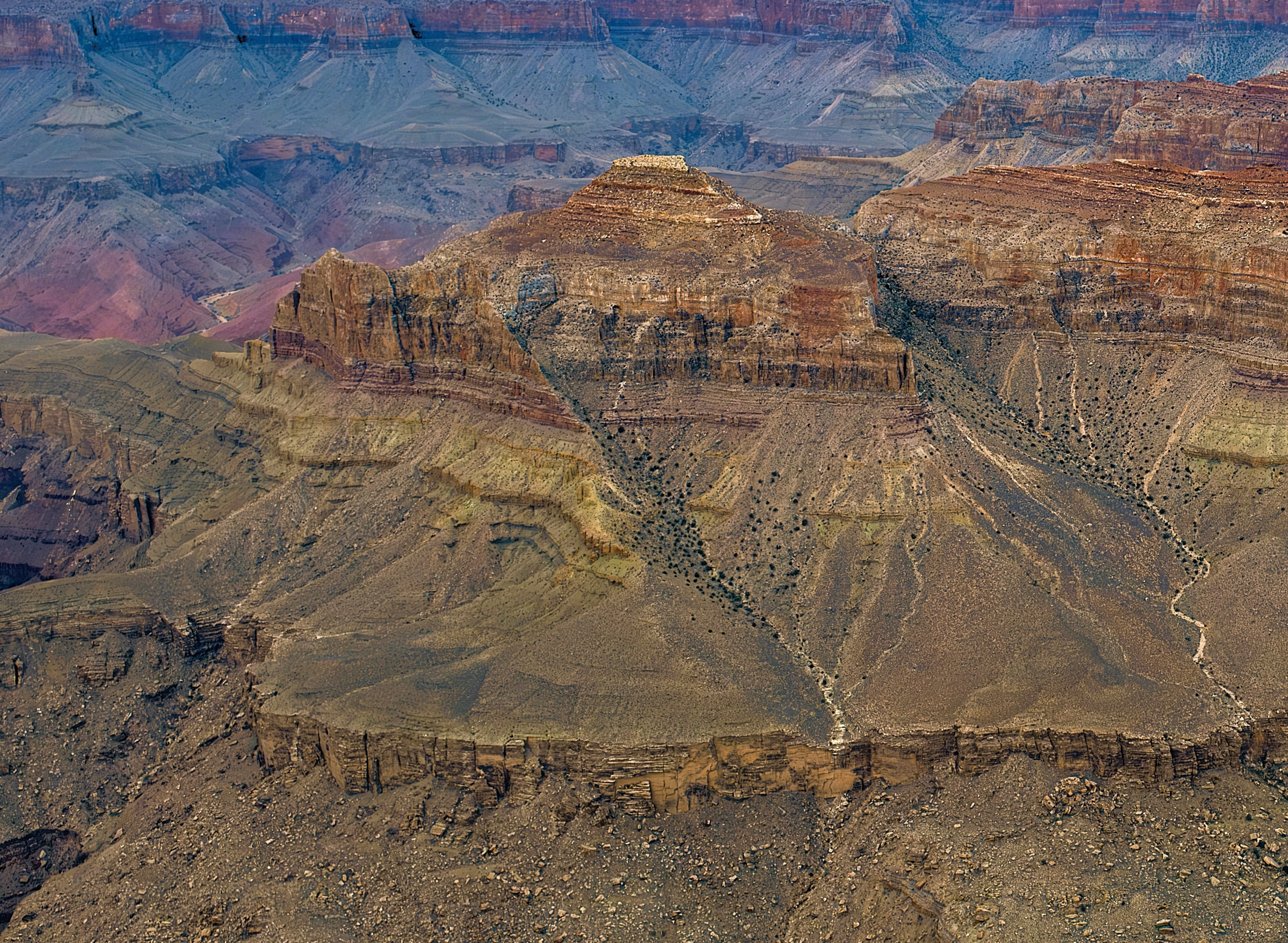
Northeast aspect

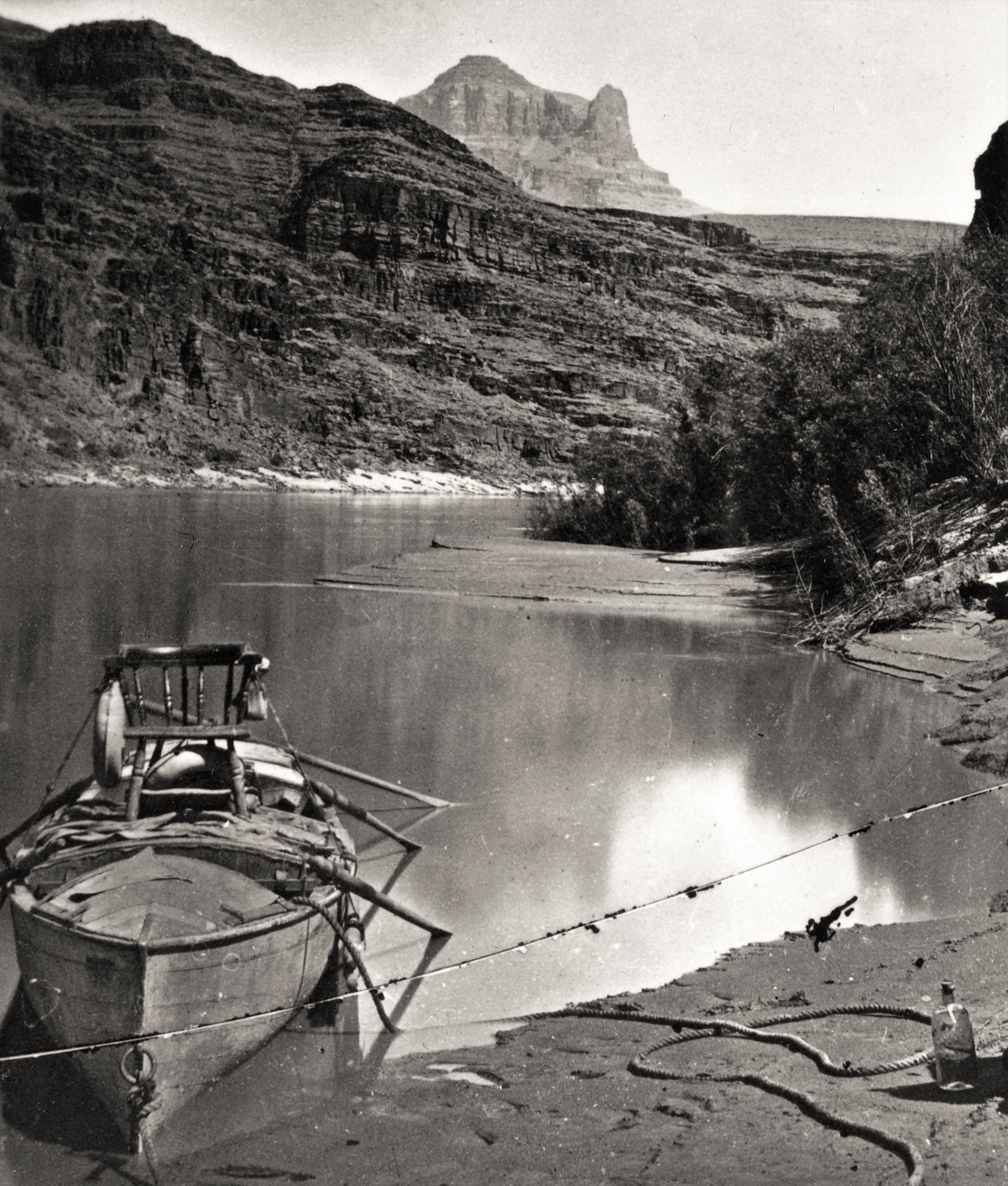
Major John Wesley Powell's boat with famous armchair.
Apollo Temple in the distance. circa 1869
