= Awatubi Crest =

Landform in the Grand Canyon, Arizona

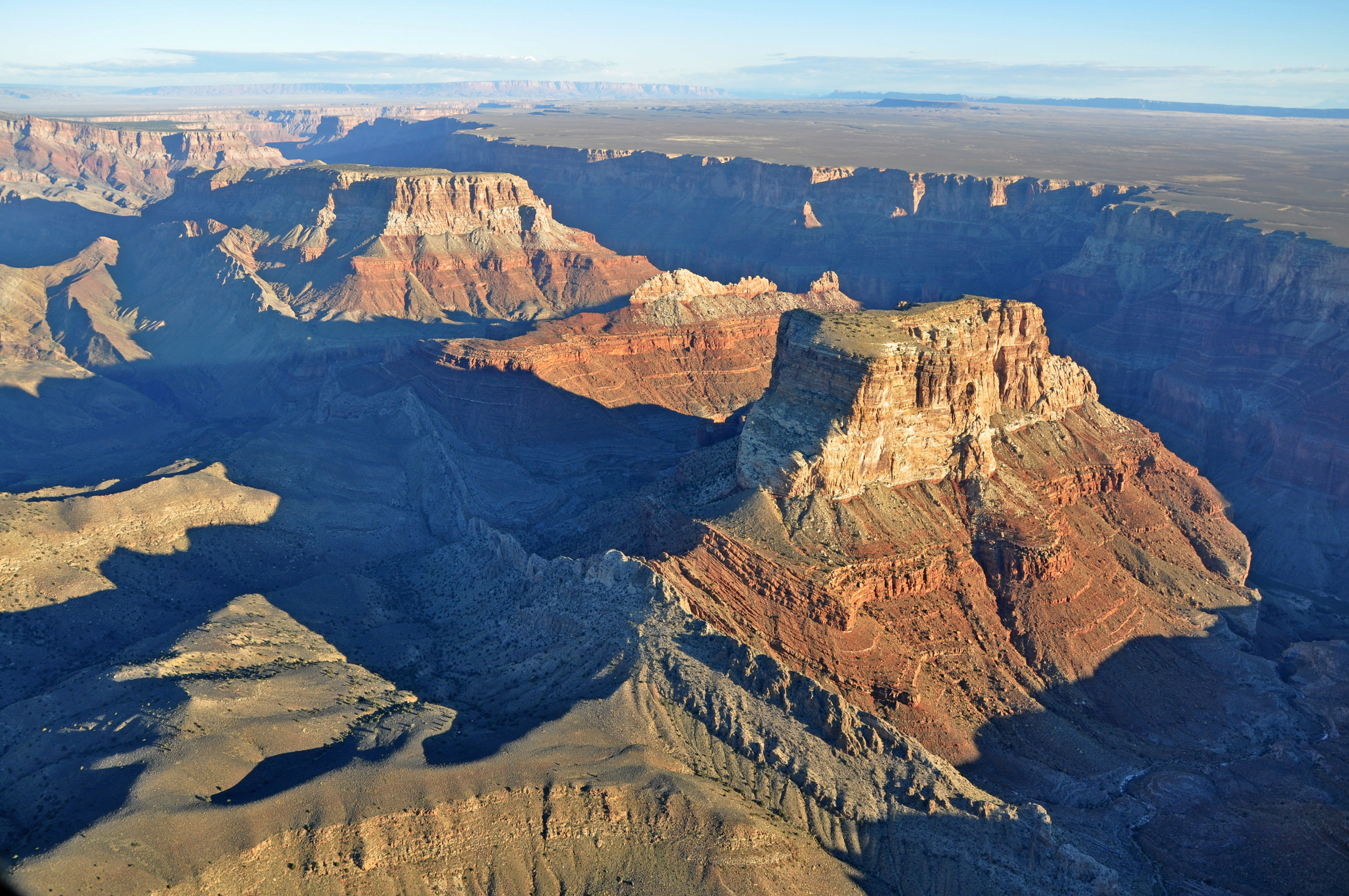
- Southwest flank of Kwagunt Butte

Highest point
- Elevation: 5,403 ft (1,647 m)
- Prominence: 463 ft (141 m)
- Parent peak: Gunther Castle
- Isolation: 1.17 mi (1.88 km)
- Coordinates: 36°12′54″N 111°50′10″W

Geography
- Location within Arizona Location within the United States
- Location: Grand Canyon National Park; Coconino County, Arizona, U.S.
- Parent range: Kaibab Plateau; Colorado Plateau
- Topo map: USGS Cape Solitude

Geology
- Rock age: Neoproterozoic
- Rock type: Kwagunt Formation (sedimentary)

Awatubi Crest is a 5,276 foot-elevation summit located in the eastern Grand Canyon, in Coconino County of northern Arizona, US. The crest is situated as a prominence between Kwagunt Butte north, and Chuar Butte south. Unlike these two buttes composed of the many common layers of Grand Canyon sedimentary rocks, the Awatubi Crest was created by the uplift of the Butte Fault exposing Kwagunt Formation rock.

The Butte Fault is expressed as a low/elevation white ridgeline, aligned north–south on the west flanks of the buttes, (and Malgosa Crest), and extends north to the west flank of Nankoweap Mesa (and Malgosa Crest). At the south terminus of the fault, and at the north flank of Chuar Butte, the Awatubi Crest prominence is composed of strongly angled thrusts of dp-brown rocks of the Kwagunt Formation.

== Geology ==
The Awatubi Crest is composed of the Kwagunt Formation exposed in two high-angle thrust sections; the east section contains the prominence; the section northwest sits on the southwest flank of Kwagunt Butte.
