= Malgosa Crest =

Landform in the Grand Canyon, Arizona

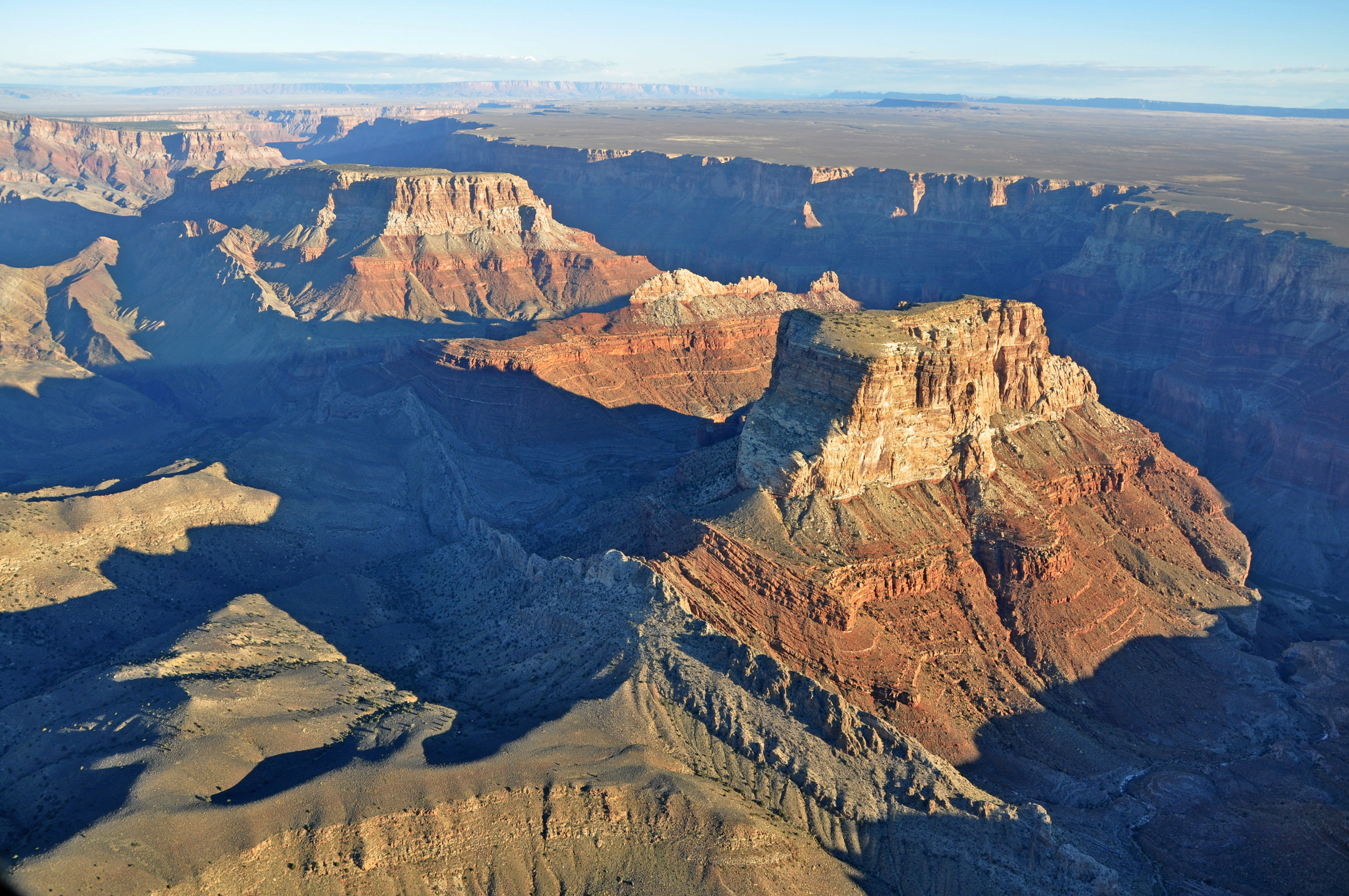
- Nankoweap Mesa-(northwest), Malgosa Crest, Kwagunt Butte-(southeast)

Highest point
- Elevation: 5,446 ft (1,660 m)
- Prominence: 850 ft (260 m)
- Parent peak: Kwagunt Butte (6,377 ft)
- Isolation: 1.2 mi (1.9 km)
- Coordinates: 36.2474853°N 111.8432171°W

Geography
- Location within Arizona Location within the United States
- Location: Grand Canyon National Park; Coconino County, Arizona, US
- Parent range: Kaibab Plateau-(at East Rim, East Grand Canyon); Colorado Plateau
- Topo map: USGS Cape Solitude

Geology
- Mountain type(s): sedimentary rock: sandstone, shale, limestone
- Rock types: (Coconino Sandstone prominence), (eroded Coconino cliffs, on Hermit Shale, on platform of Esplanade Sandstone) and Coconino Sandstone, Hermit Shale, Supai Group-(4 units) _(unit-4, Esplanade Sandstone), Redwall Limestone, Muav Limestone – (seen along east flank, with Colorado River); Bright Angel Shale

Malgosa Crest is a 5,446-foot-elevation summit located in the eastern Grand Canyon, in Coconino County of northern Arizona, US. The ridgeline-crest is situated adjacent to the East Rim, being a middle, and minor prominence, (of three major prominences), along the Butte Fault. From south to north, and bordering the due-south flowing Colorado River (west bank), are Chuar Butte, Awatubi Crest, Kwagunt Butte, Malgosa Crest, and the Nankoweap Mesa. All the prominences are near the end of Marble Canyon, (down to the Little Colorado River confluence), Marble Canyon being the start of the Grand Canyon.

Malgosa Crest has a very narrow, linear platform prominence, and the prominence is deeply eroded, and it trends slightly southwest–northeast. Because of its narrowness, its ridgeline-summit is composed of eroded remainder cliffs of cliff-formed Coconino Sandstone (on slope-formed Hermit Shale), both surviving on a resistant platform of the 4th member of the Supai Group – the resistant, cliff-former Esplanade Sandstone. (The sandstone forms The Esplanade in Western Grand Canyon, a horizontal hiking area.)

The high point of Malgosa Crest is at the center of the ridgeline (5,446 ft); a surviving lower elevation, but highly visible, caprock peak occupies the northeast end of the ridgeline (5,242 ft).

== Geology ==
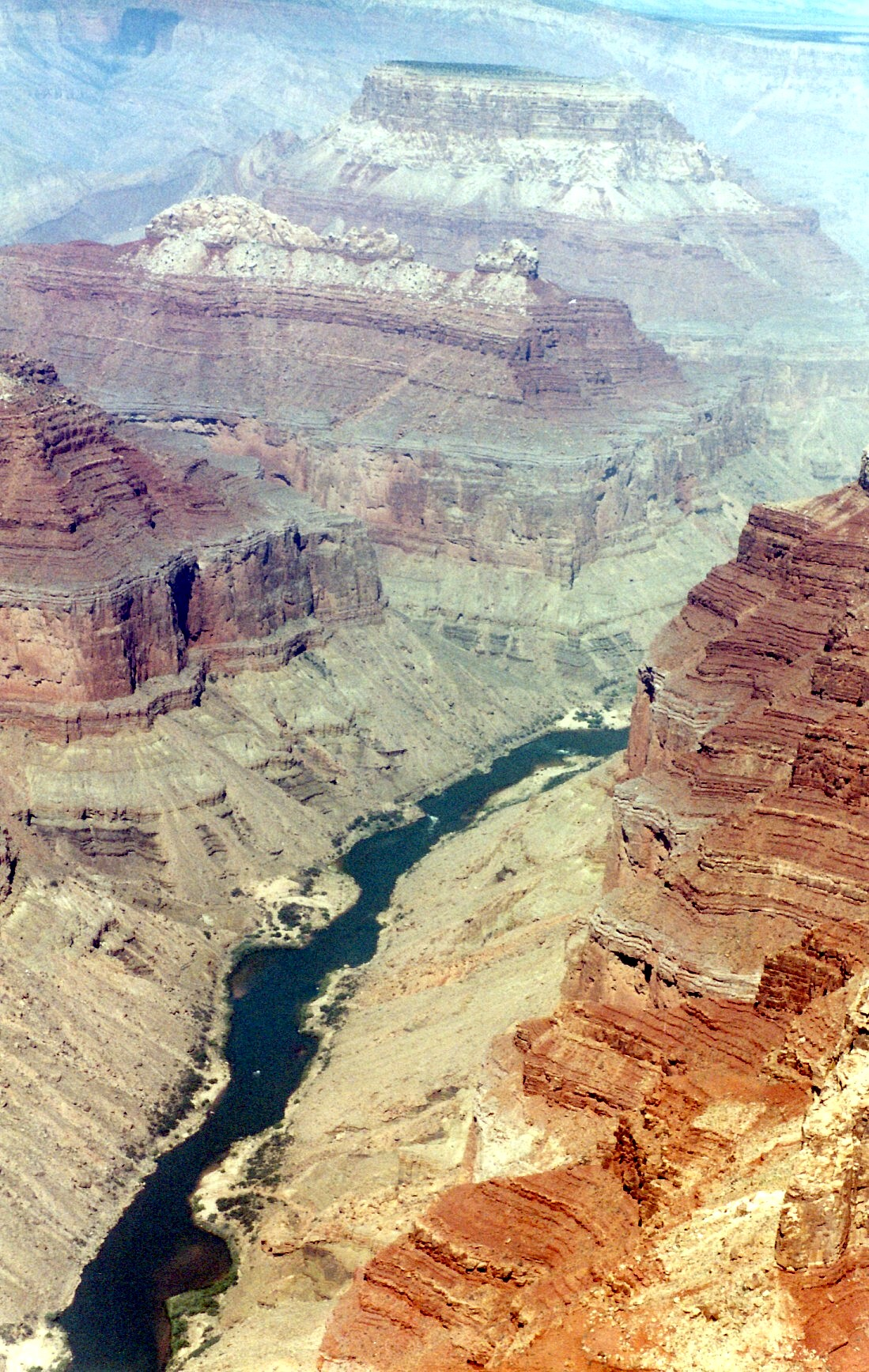
(east-flank)-Kwagunt Butte base, Malgosa Crest, (south-flank)-Nankoweap Mesa

The base rock units of Malgosa Crest and Kwagunt Butte can be seen in the above photo. At the base of the large, red Redwall Limestone cliffs, is the short cliff of Muav Limestone. The slope-forming, soft dull greenish Bright Angel Shale slopes down to the Colorado River. The Bright Angel Shale slopes are interlayered with shelfs, and rock debris hiding the slopes. Because winds course through the canyon of the Colorado River, it is likely that some exposed slopes are swept clean, revealing these interlayered shelfs. At Tanner Graben just downstream, the windswept cliff of the basalt is also very debris free (a very vertical, and resistant, ~deep black cliff).

== See also ==
- Nankoweap Mesa
- Kwagunt Butte
- Chuar Butte
- Geology of the Grand Canyon area
