= Kwagunt Butte =

Landform in the Grand Canyon, Arizona

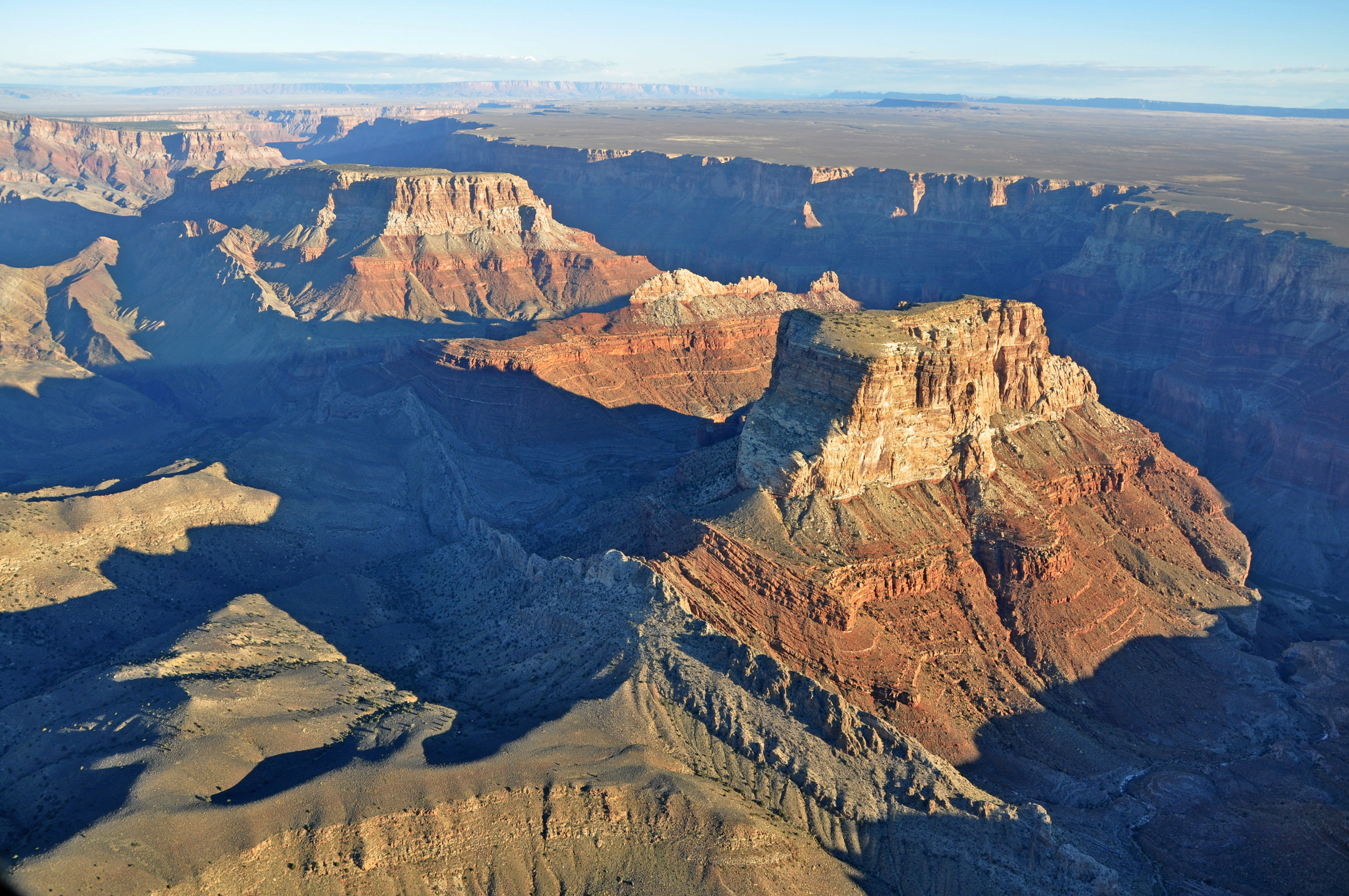
- Nankoweap Mesa-(northwest), Malgosa Crest, Kwagunt Butte-(southeast)

Highest point
- Elevation: 6,377 ft (1,944 m)
- Prominence: 1,317 ft (401 m)
- Parent peak: Chuar Butte (6,500 ft)
- Isolation: 2.15 mi (3.46 km)
- Coordinates: 36.2309°N 111.8441°W

Geography
- Location within Arizona Location within the United States
- Location: Grand Canyon National Park; Coconino County, Arizona, US
- Parent range: Kaibab Plateau-(at East Rim, East Grand Canyon); Colorado Plateau
- Topo map: USGS Cape Solitude

Geology
- Mountain type(s): sedimentary rock: limestone, siltstone, mudstone, sandstone, shale
- Rock types: (Kaibab Limestone prominence), Kaibab Limestone-Toroweap Formation-Coconino Sandstone-(mostly uneroded vertical cliffs) and Kaibab Limestone, Toroweap Formation, Coconino Sandstone, Hermit Shale, Supai Group, Redwall Limestone, Muav Limestone-(seen along east flank, with Colorado River); Bright Angel Shale

Kwagunt Butte is a 6,377-foot-elevation summit located in the eastern Grand Canyon, in Coconino County of northern Arizona, US. It is situated adjacent to the East Rim, being the second (middle) major prominence along the Butte Fault. From south to north and bordering the due-south flowing Colorado River (west bank), are Chuar Butte, Kwagunt Butte, Malgosa Crest, and the Nankoweap Mesa. All the prominences are near the end of Marble Canyon, (down to the Little Colorado River confluence), Marble Canyon being the start of the Grand Canyon.

Kwagunt Butte has a narrow, linear platform prominence, (only sparsely vegetated), that trends southwest–northeast. The high point is at the southwest (6,377 ft), the lower prominence at the northeast is 6158 ft.

== Geology ==
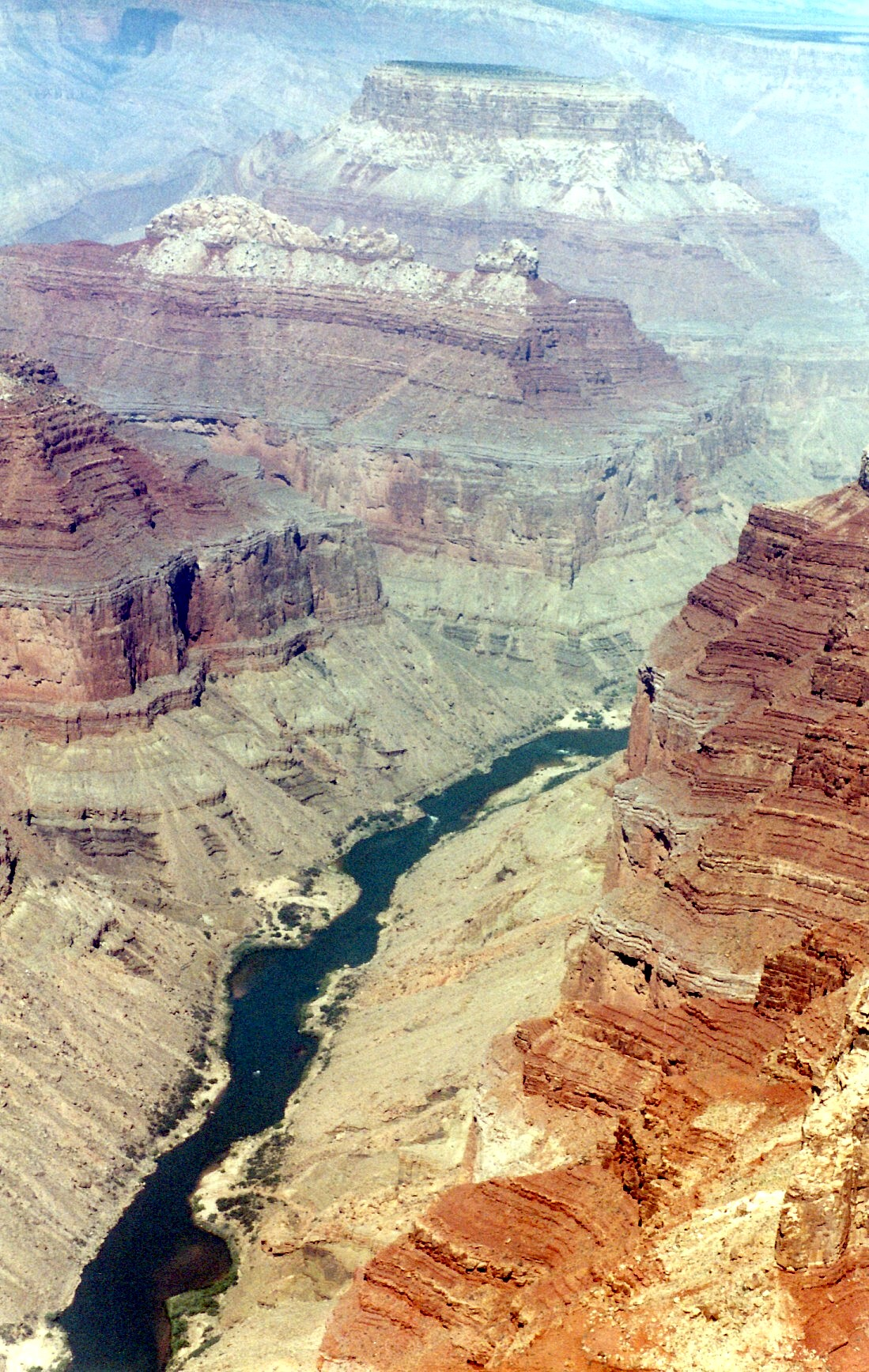
(east-flank)-Kwagunt Butte base, Malgosa Crest, (south-flank)-Nankoweap Mesa

The base rock units of Kwagunt Butte can be seen in the above photo. At the base of the large, red Redwall Limestone cliff, is the short cliff of Muav Limestone. The slope-forming, soft dull greenish Bright Angel Shale slopes down to the Colorado River. The Bright Angel Shale slopes are interlaced with shelves, and rock debris hiding the slopes. Because winds course through the canyon of the Colorado River, it is likely that some exposed slopes are swept clean, revealing these interlayered shelfs. At Tanner Graben just downstream, the windswept cliff of the basalt is also very debris free (a very vertical, and resistant, ~deep black cliff).

== See also ==
- Chuar Butte
- Nankoweap Mesa, (the third & north “butte” along the Butte Fault system)
- Geology of the Grand Canyon area
