= Tanner Graben =

Landform in the Grand Canyon, Arizona

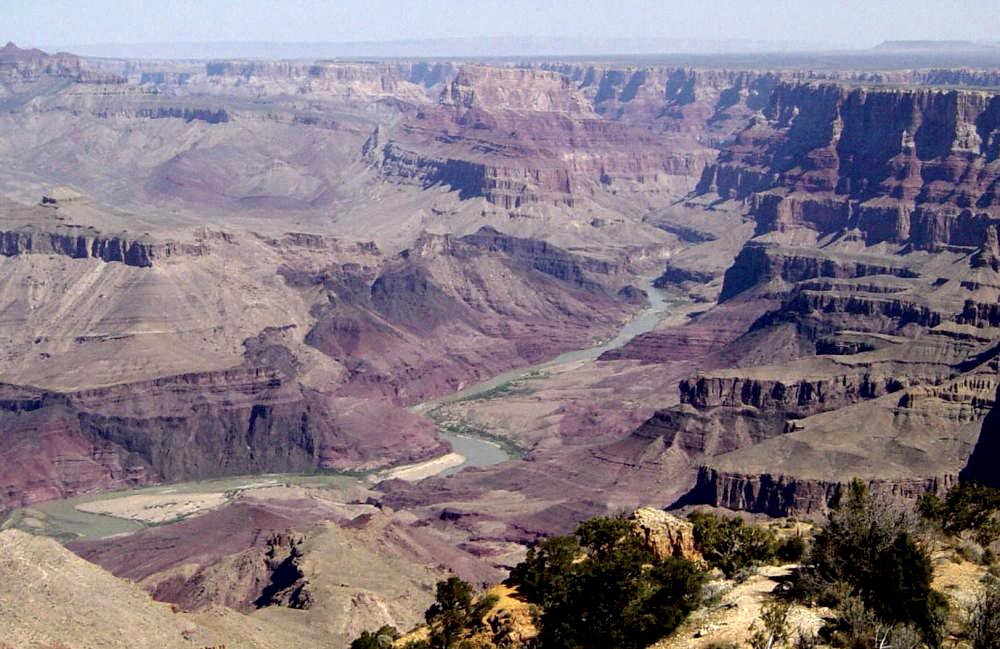
- View north, upriver, Temple and Chuar Buttes, on west bank of Colorado River, East Rim to photo right, and extending to center, top. Black Cardenas Basalt of Tanner Graben, at photo bottom-left, with layered Nankoweap Formation at Tanner Graben prominence. (Mile 68.5, Colorado River)

Highest point
- Elevation: 4,200 ft (1,300 m)– Lava Butte (Grand Canyon), 4,242 feet (1,293 m)
- Coordinates: 36°06′14″N 111°50′02″W

Geography
- Location within Arizona
- Location: Grand Canyon, Colorado River, Mile 68.5, Desert View, (East Rim)
- Settlement: Desert View, Arizona

Geology
- Mountain type(s): Nankoweap Formation-(prominence), Cardenas Basalt & Dox Formation

Located directly downstream of the Little Colorado River confluence with the Colorado River, the Tanner Graben, in the Grand Canyon, Arizona, US is a prominence and cliffside rock formation below the East Rim. Tanner Graben is located riverside, on the Colorado River, on a north-northwest bank at Mile 68.5, and lies opposite Tanner Canyon. The Tanner Rapid, created by Tanner Creek lies at the riverside foot of the graben. The graben is a pronounced feature because of the black Cardenas Basalt that forms the middle section of the graben, presumably free of debris accumulation by its cliff face steepness, and winds, and airflow drainage that course through the Colorado River's canyons; unprotected side canyons of Cardenas Basalt show accumulations as a slope-forming geologic unit, with little showing of black basalt.

The Tanner Graben sits on the Butte Fault which trends north-south up the Colorado River, and the west side of Temple Butte; it forms the east flank of Tanner Graben.

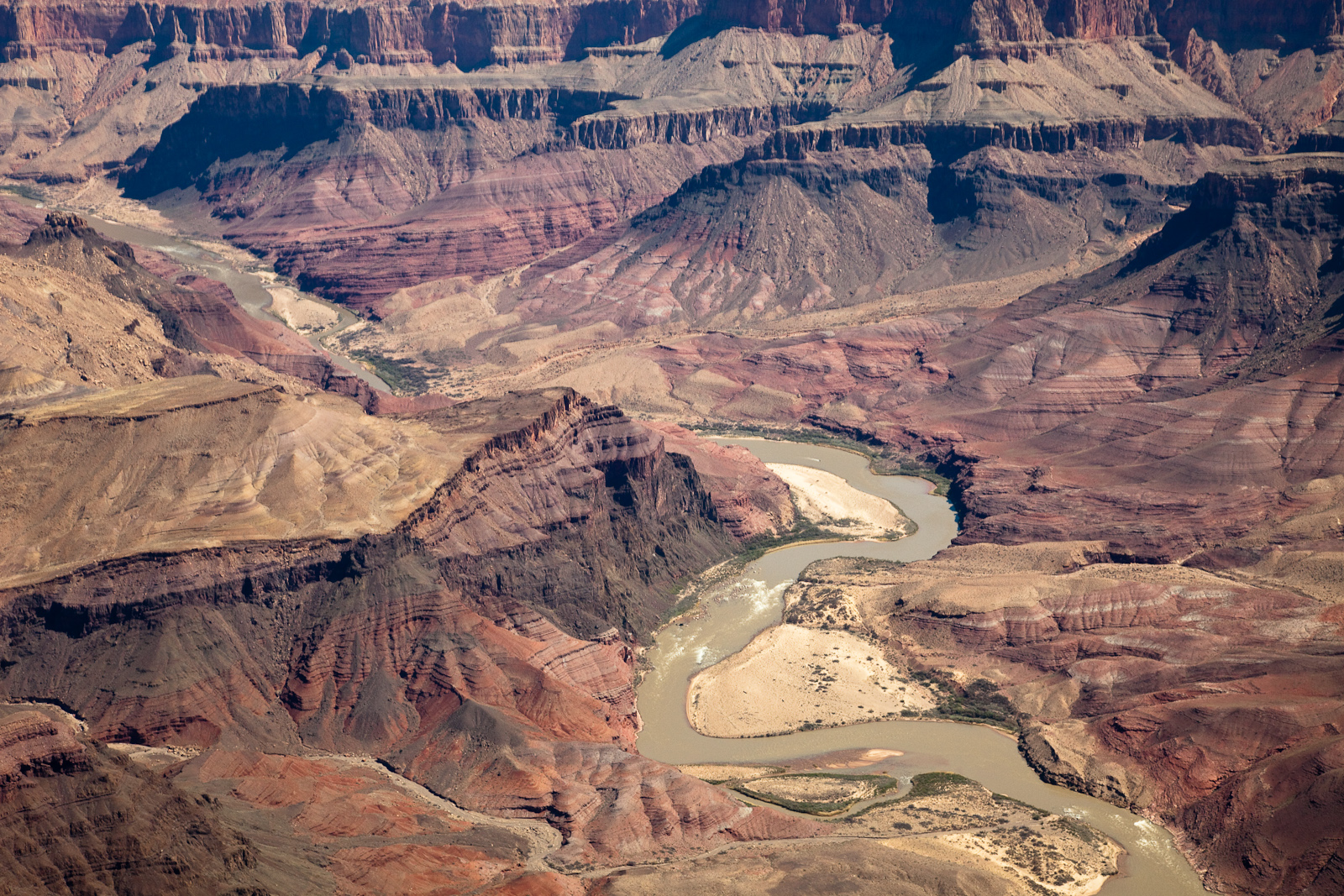
The prominent change in the course of the Colorado River, probably related to the Tanner Graben (and the fault system). Note the steepness of the graben, and lack of accumulated debris.

The Butte Fault is connected to the East Kaibab Monocline which trends north-south up the Colorado River, and turns north-northwest forming the east perimeter of the Kaibab Plateau, which lies due-north of the Tanner Graben region.

== Geology ==
The south face of the Tanner Graben block shows three distinct geology units, all conformably laid members of the Grand Canyon Supergroup-(and Unkar Group), and are at a paleo-tilted (fault) angle of about 15 degrees. The prominence is horizontal (15 degrees dip to ~north-northeast?) caprock section of distinctively, multi-layered Nankoweap Formation, which is a unit of the Grand Canyon Supergroup. The Nankoweap Formation is conformably laid on member units of the Unkar Group, the lowest and first group of the Grand Canyon Supergroup. The black Cardenas Basalt, makes up much of the Tanner Graben; it sits on erodable, softer, reddish, and layered-(inter-bedded) Dox Formation. The Dox Formation forms the west and east sides of the narrow southeast flank of the Tanner Graben, and shows its down-dropped distance.

== Access ==
Views of the Tanner Graben can be made from the Tanner Trail as it descends down the west ridgeline of the north-trending Tanner Canyon (Tanner Creek). The trail descends from Desert View, East Rim-(Desert View Watchtower), where many viewpoints along the East Rim look down to the Tanner Graben. Tanner Graben is 1.5 miles west of Comanche Point, which is 3 miles north of Desert View, East Rim.

== Grand Canyon Supergroup geologic sequence ==
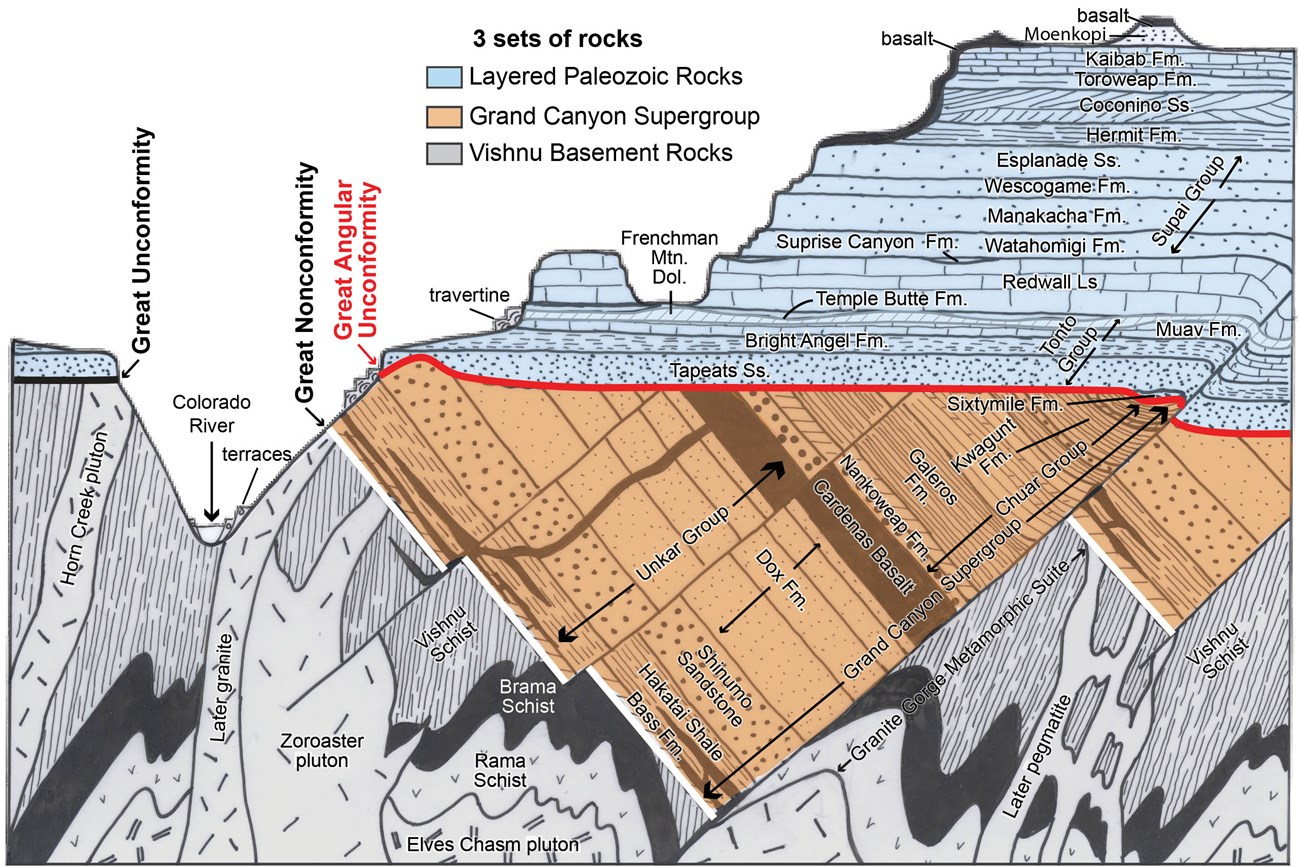
Geologic stratigraphic column of strata exposed in and near the Grand Canyon showing stratigraphic units and major unconformities.

The units of the Grand Canyon Supergroup:

Chuar Group

- Kwagunt Formation
- Galeros Formation
- Nankoweap Formation

Unkar Group

- Cardenas Basalt, youngest, Meso-Proterozoic 1070 ± 70 million years
- Dox Formation
- Shinumo Quartzite
- Hakatai Shale
- Bass Formation
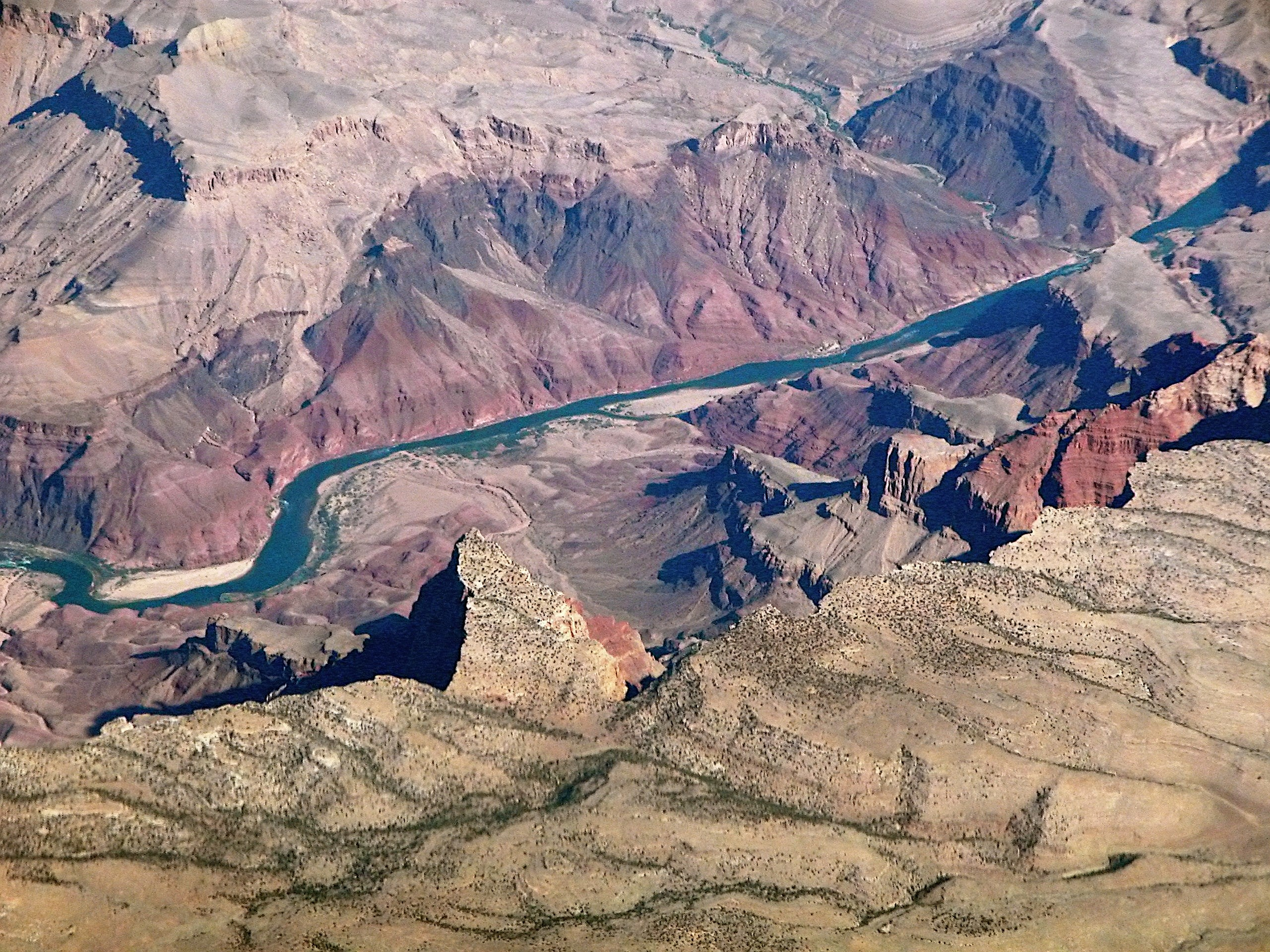
View from Comanche Point. Tanner Rapid and Tanner Graben, photo, bottom-left, showing 1-southeast cliff-face, 2-northeast side, and 3-upper surface of graben.

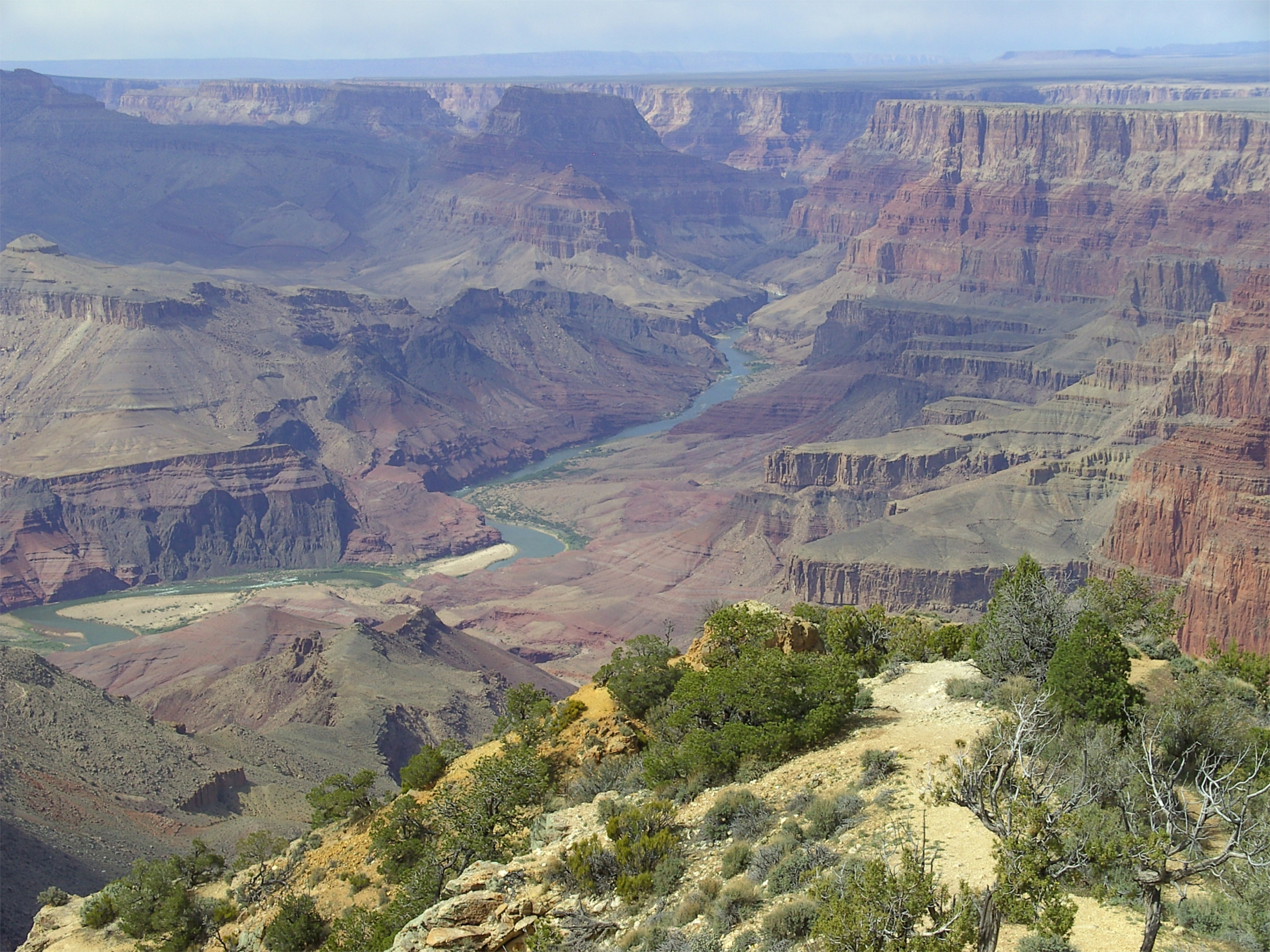
View upriver from Tanner Trail-region (west ridgeline of Tanner Canyon, Desert View, East Rim)
(black graben, center-edge, photo left)

== See also ==
- List of Colorado River rapids and features
