= Nankoweap Mesa =

Landform in the Grand Canyon, Arizona

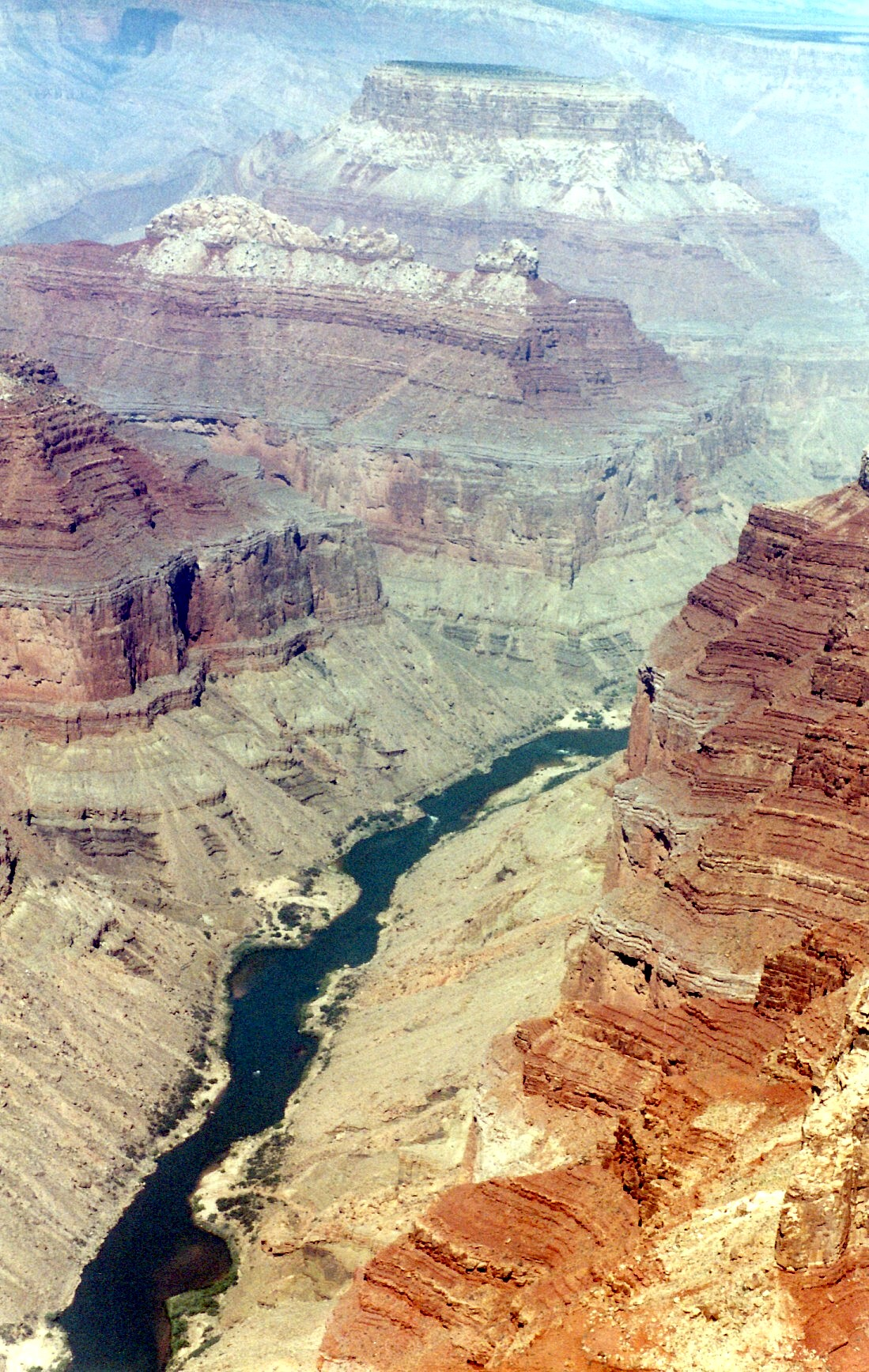
- Malgosa Crest-(center), (south-flank)-Nankoweap Mesa-(north) (part of Kwagunt Butte is at photo left)

Highest point
- Elevation: 6,316 ft (1,925 m)
- Prominence: 1,636 ft (499 m)
- Parent peak: Kwagunt Butte (6,377 ft)
- Isolation: 2.63 mi (4.23 km)
- Coordinates: 36.2668°N 111.8597°W

Geography
- Location within Arizona Location within the United States
- Location: Grand Canyon National Park; Coconino County, Arizona, US
- Parent range: Kaibab Plateau; Colorado Plateau
- Topo map: USGS Cape Solitude

Geology
- Mountain type(s): sedimentary rock: limestone, siltstone, mudstone, sandstone, shale
- Rock types: (Kaibab Limestone prominence), Kaibab Limestone-Toroweap Formation-Coconino Sandstone-(mostly uneroded vertical cliffs) and Kaibab Limestone, Toroweap Formation, Coconino Sandstone, Hermit Shale, Supai Group, Redwall Limestone, Muav Limestone-(seen along east flank, with Colorado River); Bright Angel Shale

Nankoweap Mesa is a 6,316-foot-elevation (1925 m) summit located in the eastern Grand Canyon, in Coconino County of northern Arizona, USA. It is situated adjacent to the East Rim, being the north major prominence along the Butte Fault. From south to north, and bordering the due-south flowing Colorado River (west bank), are Chuar Butte, Awatubi Crest, Kwagunt Butte, Malgosa Crest, and the Nankoweap Mesa. All the prominences are near the end of Marble Canyon, (down to the Little Colorado River confluence), Marble Canyon being the start of the Grand Canyon.

The North terminus of the mesa has a lower elevation prominence, (6,073 ft), and the center of the mesa contains a minor saddle point. One famous historical native tribes remains, is the Nankoweap Granaries, on the mesa's northeast flank, and overlooking the Colorado River.

== Geology ==
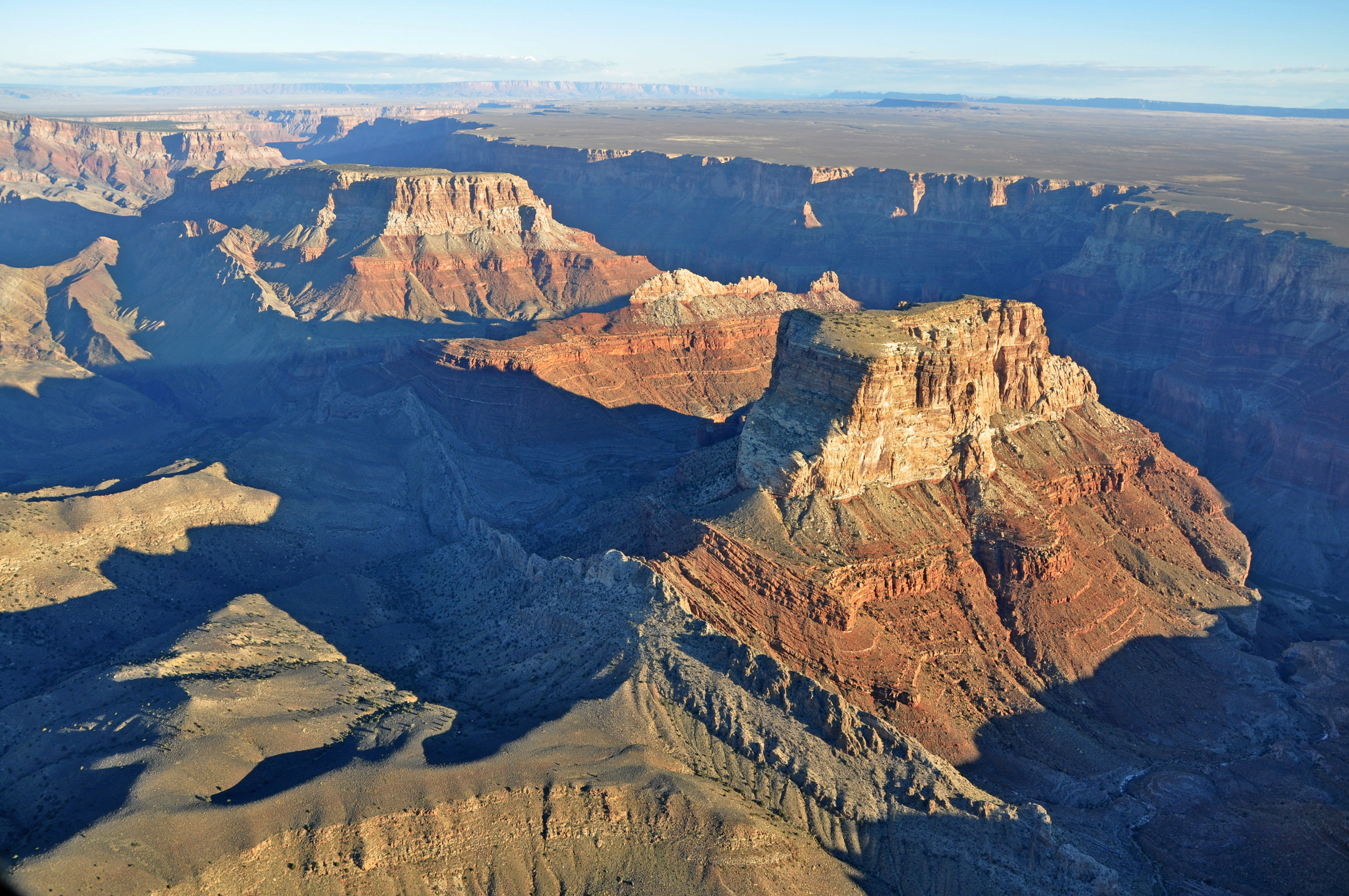
(south-flank)-Nankoweap Mesa, Malgosa Crest, Kwagunt Butte (the Coconino Sandstone cliff-remainder can be seen on the lower elevation Malgosa Crest)

The series of prominences from Chuar Butte northward are quite similar geologically. South of Chuar, volcanic extrusions have altered the region (Lava Creek, Lava Butte). The three prominences in the above photo can be seen sitting on the slopes of the red Supai Group members and the red cliffs of the Redwall Limestone. The slopes of the dull greenish Bright Angel Shale are the bases of the landforms.

== See also ==
- Malgosa Crest
- Kwagunt Butte
- Geology of the Grand Canyon area
