= Gunther Castle =

Landform in the Grand Canyon, Arizona

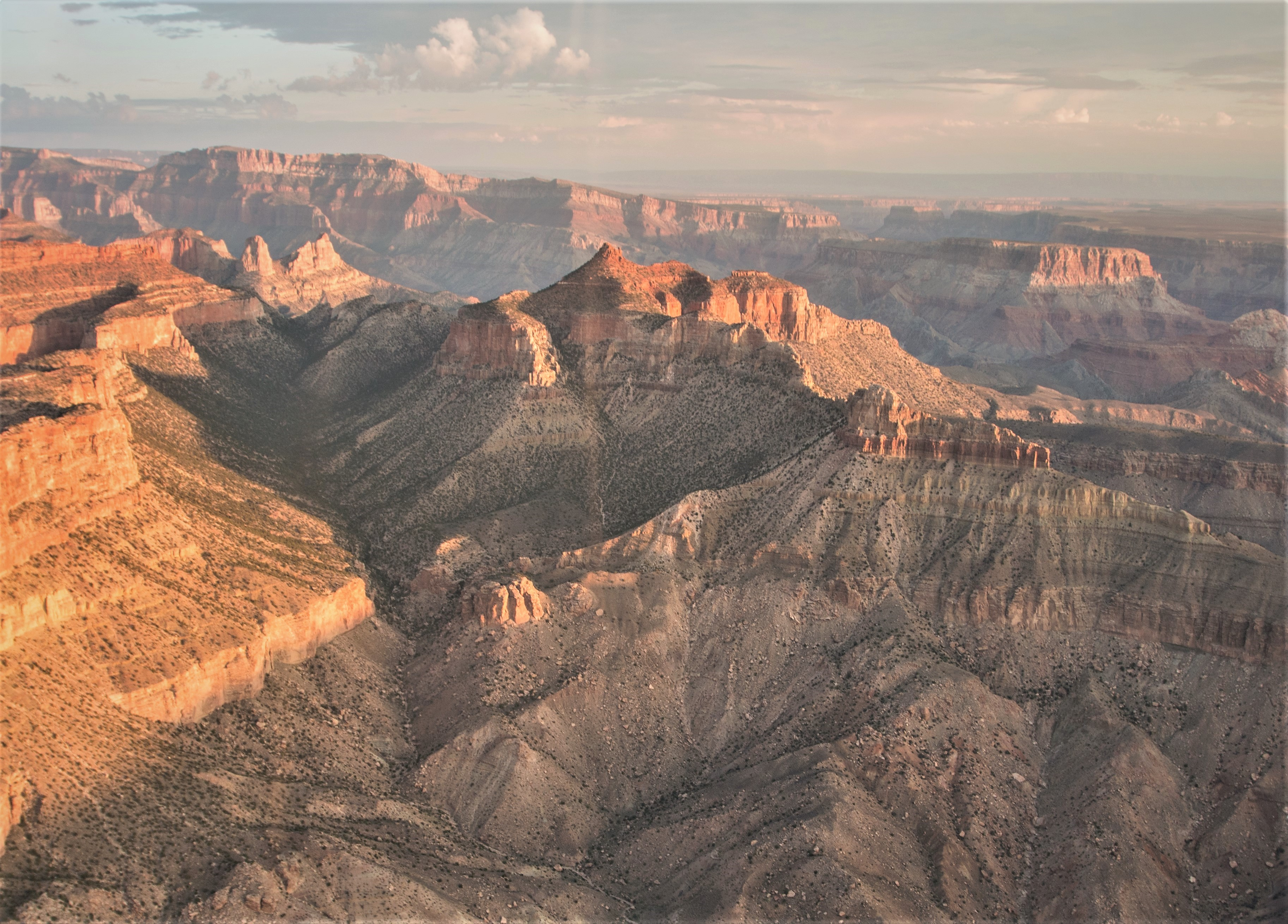
- South aspect, aerial view

Highest point
- Elevation: 7,199 ft (2,194 m)
- Prominence: 1,019 ft (311 m)
- Parent peak: Butchart Butte (7,602 ft)
- Isolation: 1.41 mi (2.27 km)
- Coordinates: 36°12′33″N 111°52′19″W

Geography
- Location within Arizona Location within the United States
- Country: United States
- State: Arizona
- County: Coconino
- Protected area: Grand Canyon National Park
- Parent range: Kaibab Plateau; Colorado Plateau
- Topo map: USGS Cape Solitude

Geology
- Rock type(s): sandstone, siltstone, limestone

Climbing
- First ascent: 1969

Gunther Castle is a 7,199-foot-elevation (2,194-meter) summit located in the Grand Canyon, in Coconino County of northern Arizona, US. It is situated three miles northwest of Chuar Butte, between Kwagunt Valley to the north, and Chuar Valley to the south. Topographic relief is significant as it rises nearly 4,500 feet (1,400 meters) above the Colorado River in three miles.

Gunther Castle is named for Gunther, the historical king of Burgundy in Germanic mythology. This feature's name was officially adopted in 1906 by the U.S. Board on Geographic Names.

The top dome of Gunther Castle is composed of lower strata of the Pennsylvanian-Permian Supai Group. This overlays the conspicuous cliff-forming layer of Mississippian Redwall Limestone, which in turn overlays shale of the Cambrian Tonto Group. According to the Köppen climate classification system, Gunther Castle is located in a Cold semi-arid climate zone. Precipitation runoff from Gunther Castle drains east to the nearby Colorado River via Chuar and Kwagunt Creeks.

The first ascent of Gunther Castle was made by Alan Doty, Doc Ellis, Donald Davis, and Harvey Butchart in June 1969. However, they were not the first to set foot on the summit, as they concluded that surveyors had previously arrived by helicopter, having found a surveyor's marker made of wood and a large coil of unused wire.

== See also ==
- Geology of the Grand Canyon area

== Gallery ==
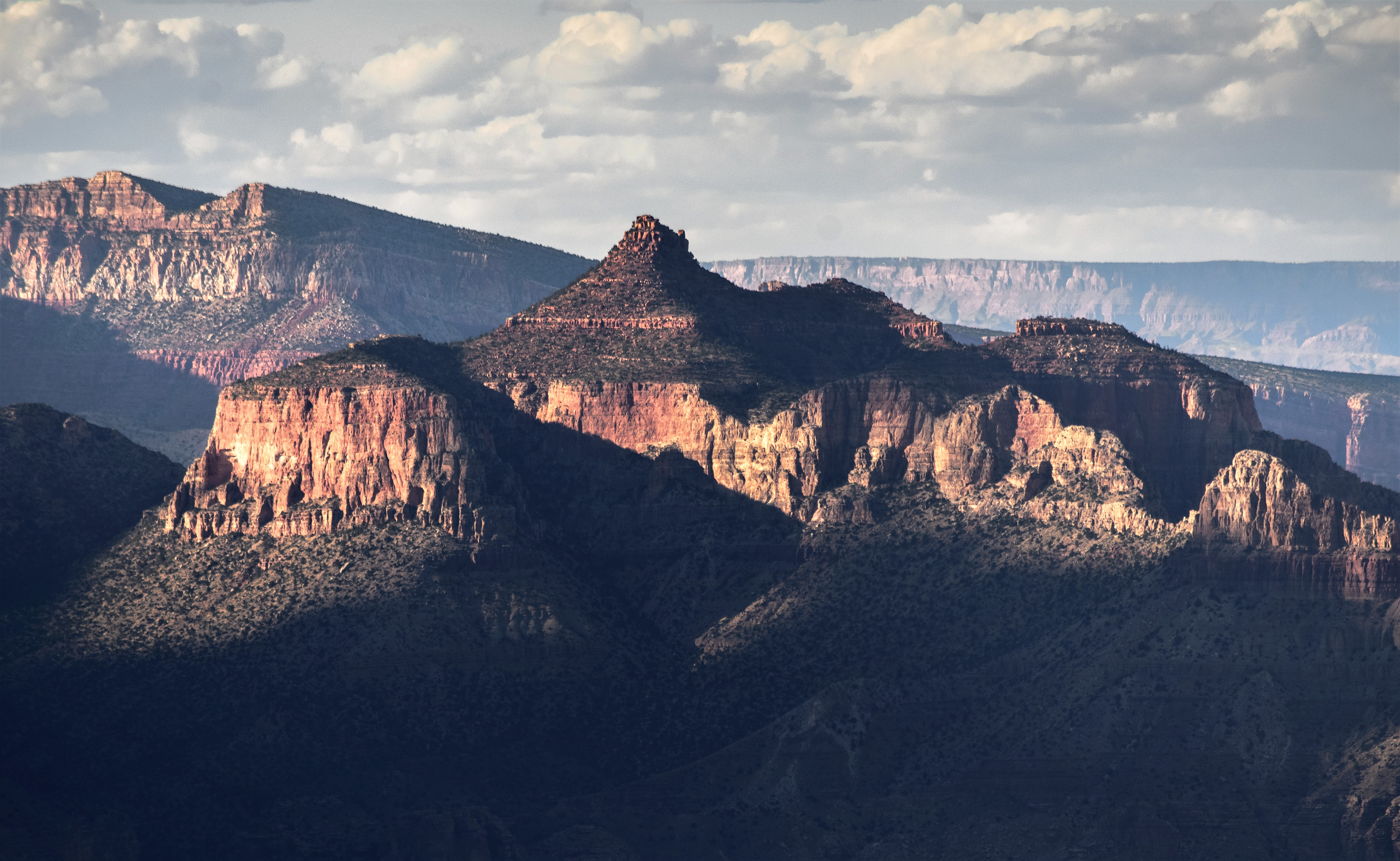

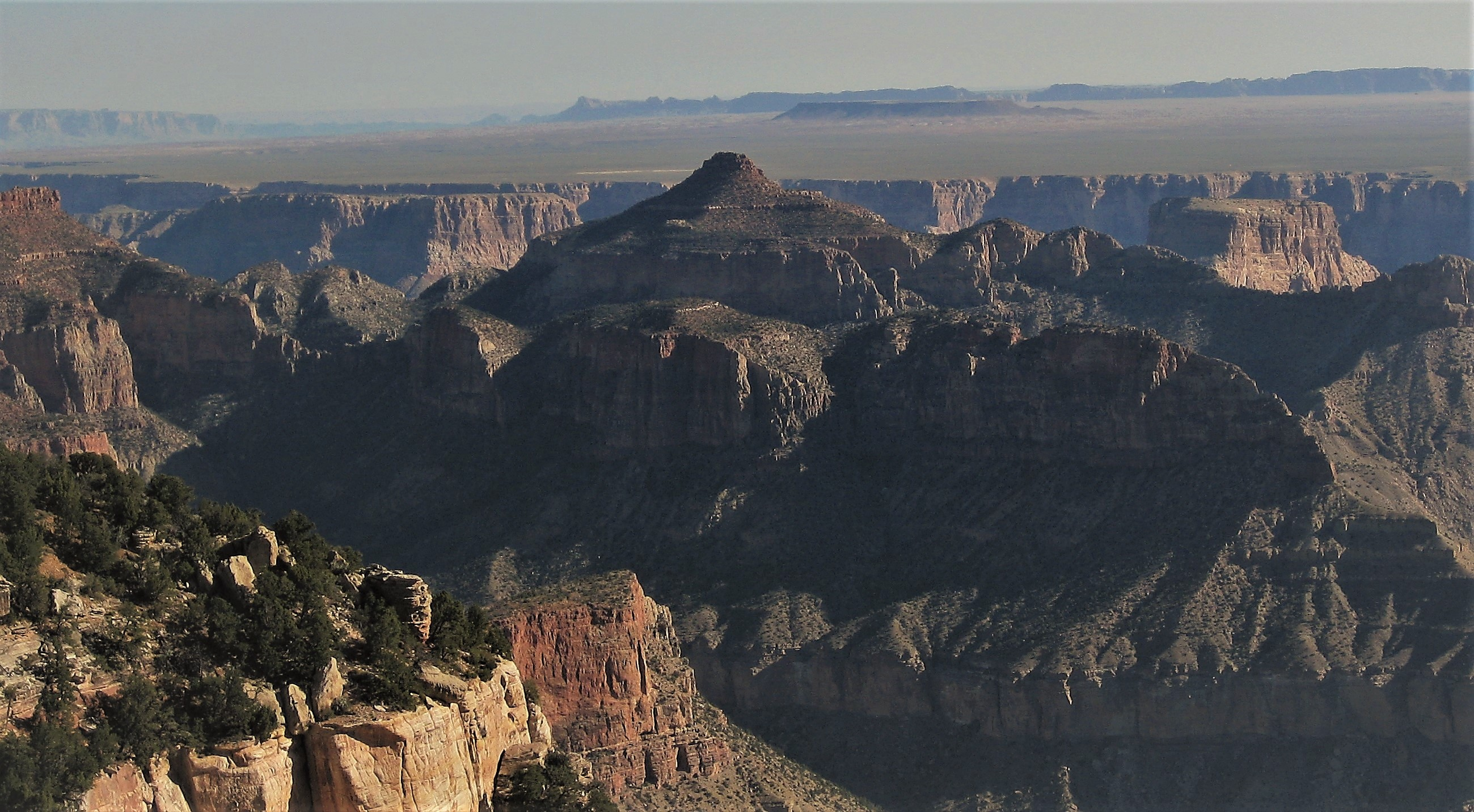
Gunther Castle from Cape Final

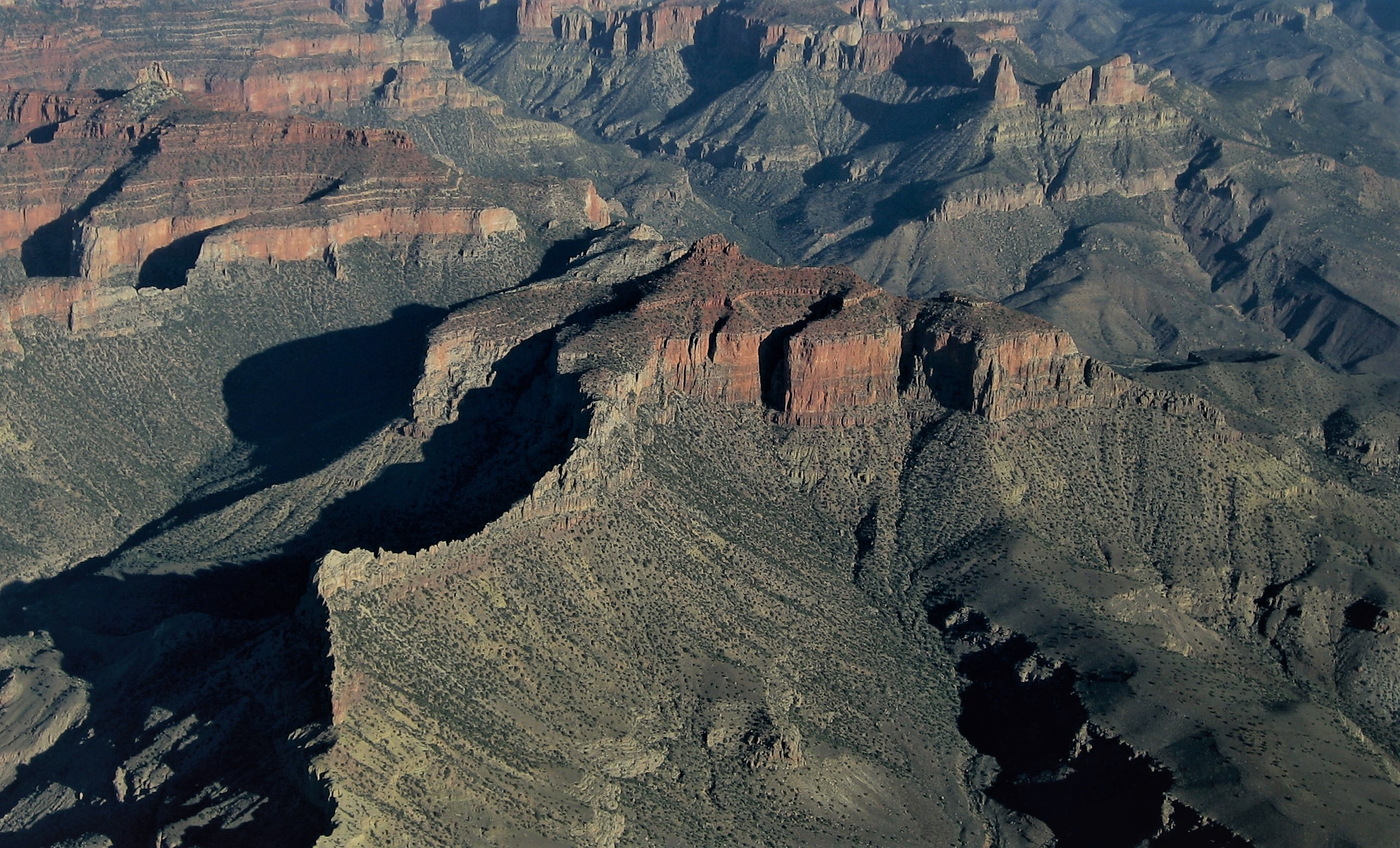
Gunther centered, aerial view looking northwest. Butchart Butte upper left.
