= Temple Butte =

Landform in the Grand Canyon, Arizona

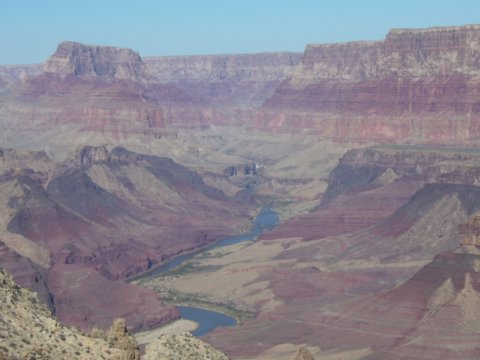
- Temple Butte, and Lava Butte. Temple Butte is the mountain formation almost impossible to see that is located in the left background of this photo in front of a higher mountain formation with a black wall. Just behind Temple Butte is a higher mountain formation with a black wall, which is Chuar Butte.

Highest point
- Elevation: 5,308 ft (1,618 m)
- Prominence: 859 ft (262 m)
- Parent peak: Chuar Butte (6,500 ft)
- Isolation: 1.77 mi (2.85 km)
- Coordinates: 36°09′45″N 111°49′26″W

Geography
- Location within Arizona
- Location: Palisades of the Desert, East Rim, Grand Canyon
- Settlement: Grand Canyon Village, Arizona
- Parent range: East Rim, 2-mi south of Little Colorado River with Colorado
- Topo map: USGS Cape Solitude

Geology
- Mountain type(s): sedimentary rock: sandstone, siltstone, mudstone, limestone, shale, sandstone
- Rock type(s): Supai Group-(unit 4, eroded-prominence), Esplanade Sandstone), Supai Group, Redwall Limestone, (Tonto Group-(3 units)), 3_Muav Limestone, 2_Bright Angel Shale, 1_Tapeats Sandstone

Climbing
- Easiest route: class 4 climbing

Temple Butte, in the Grand Canyon, Arizona, US is a prominence below the East Rim. The butte lies on the west bank of the south-flowing Colorado River. The outfall from the Little Colorado River, draining from the Painted Desert to the east and southeast, is about two miles upstream.

Temple Butte is 5,308 feet (1,618 m) in elevation. It is the historical site of some wreckage of the 1956 Grand Canyon mid-air collision. It was first thought that smoke from Temple Butte, was due to a lightning strike fire, but later was found to be the result of the mid-air collision.

== Trails ==
The Tanner Trail from Desert View, Arizona down to the Colorado River, follows the west ridgeline of Tanner Canyon, and has numerous views looking due-north to Temple Butte. The trail ends at a viewpoint on the upper surfaces of a Redwall Limestone ridge. The Redwall Limestone is seen prominently below the East Rim, and is the cliff-forming shelf upon which the redbeds of the Supai Group accumulate.

== Geology ==
The prominence of Temple Butte is composed of the upper unit of the Supai Group, ("redbeds"), the cliff-former, Esplanade Sandstone. The entire prominence is a much eroded, cliff remainder of the Esplanade, but the four units of the Supai Group, are compact, in an approximate north-south direction, with a large-pyramid-shape at the north, a pointed-pyramid at the south, and an eroded saddle in between.

The Supai Group sits on the platform, upper surface of the Redwall Limestone, on Cambrian rock units below. Another upper platform of the cliff-forming Muav Limestone, underlies the Redwall. (It is a double-platform rock unit.) The slopes of colorful Bright Angel Shale are below. And below that are the short cliffs of Tapeats Sandstone, (typically bordering gorges and the Colorado River), famous for making the Tonto Platform, above the 1,000-million year old Great Unconformity of lost time, and eroded rock units.

The east strike (section) of the Butte Fault is on the west side of Temple Butte. The west section of the Butte Fault is the East Kaibab Monocline. The Butte Fault sections are north-south trending, and are part of the uplift of the Kaibab Plateau.

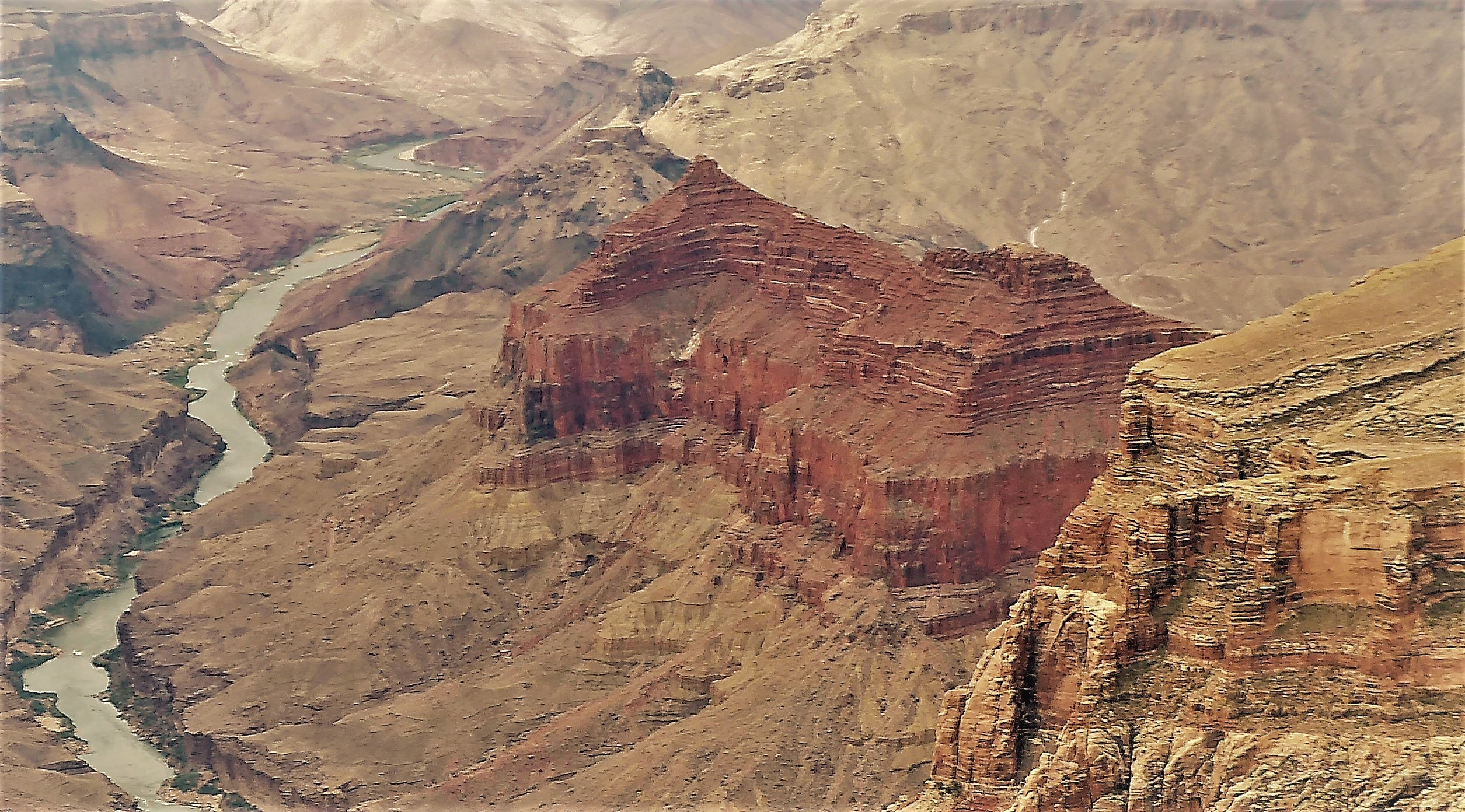
Temple Butte, aerial from north

== Access ==
Desert View is the closest paved route site to Temple Butte viewpoints. It is located on the East Rim, and is about 20 mi (32 km) east of Grand Canyon Village, on the East Rim Road, (Arizona State Route 64). Desert View is also 32 mi (51 km) west of U.S. 89, by way of Arizona 64.

=== Observation viewpoints ===
Temple Butte can be viewed from the south at East Rim, Grand Canyon viewpoints in the vicinity of Desert View, Arizona. Lipan Point, Desert View Point, and to the south Hollenback Point have views due-north into the Grand Canyon. About 5 mi (8.0 km) north of Desert View Point by unimproved road, or hiking is Comanche Point, a distance of 5-mi south-southeast of Temple Butte.

An unimproved route, going north from Desert View, about 12 to 14 mi long ends at Cape Solitude; the point is adjacent the south canyon outfall of the Little Colorado River and canyon, with the Colorado River. Temple Butte is 2.5 mi (4.0 km) west.

== Gallery ==
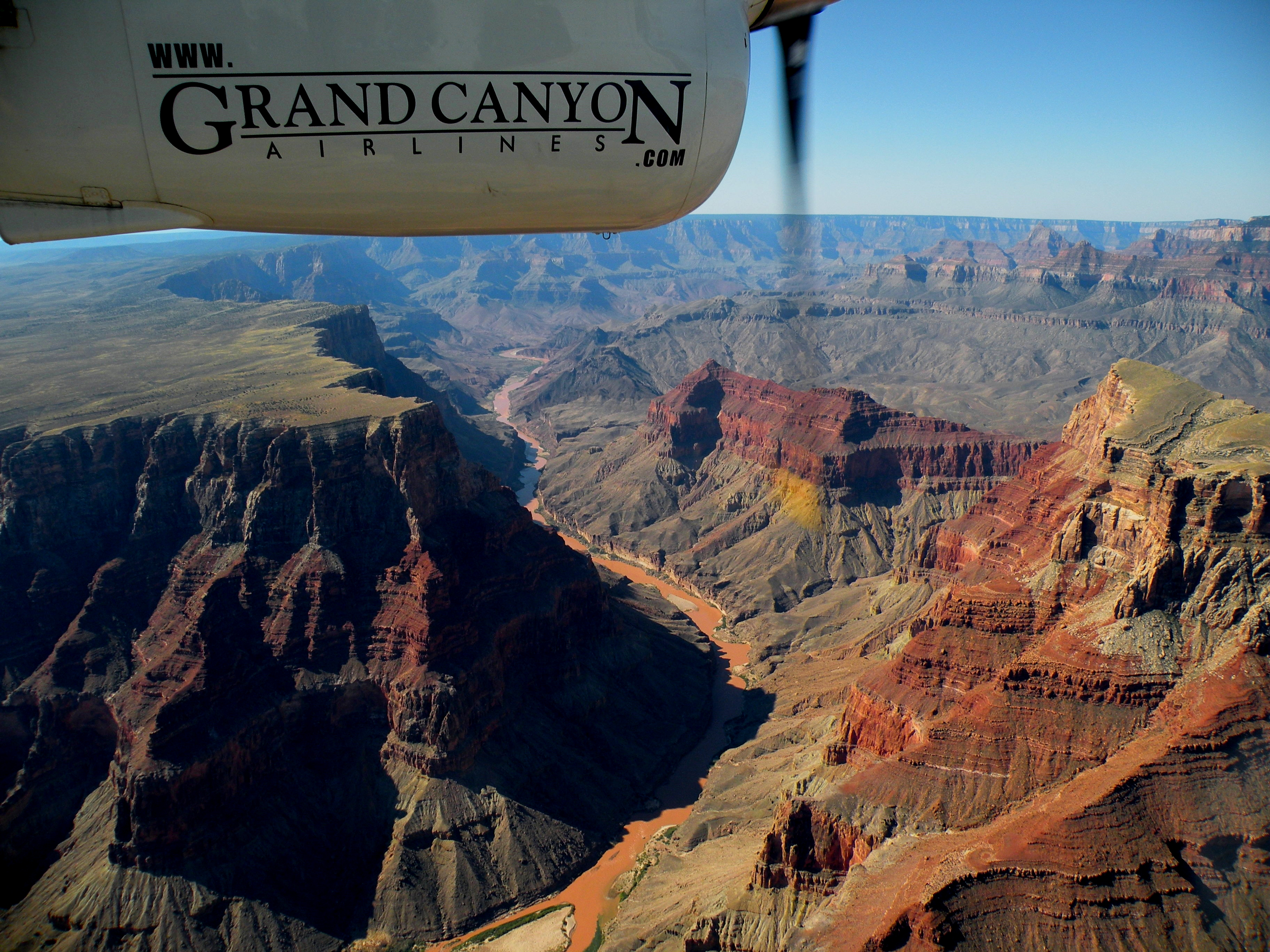
Cape Solitude,
Chuar Lava Hill,
Temple Butte &
Chuar Butte prominence

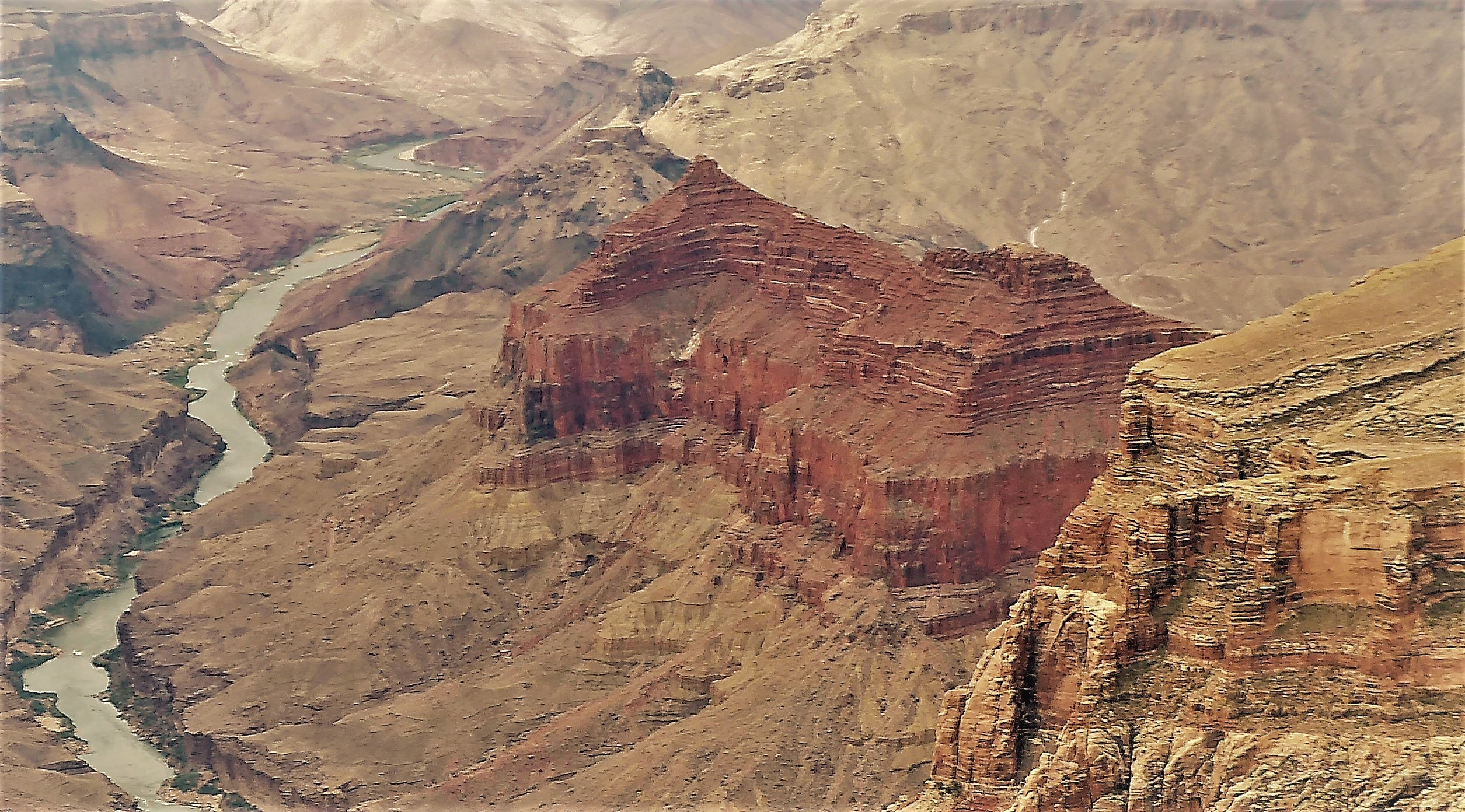
(aerial view)-Chuar Lava Hill,
Temple Butte,
Chuar Butte

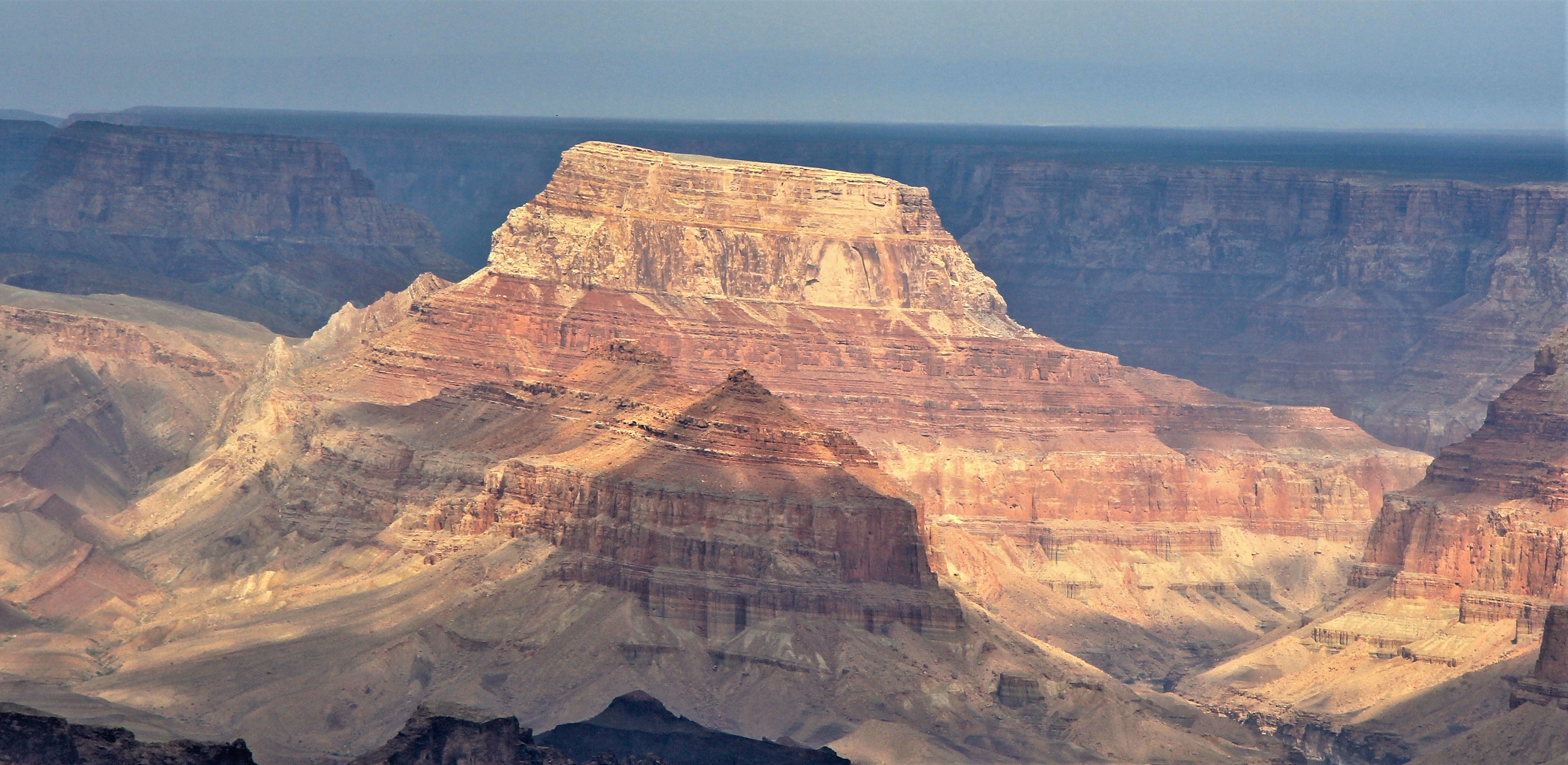
Chuar and
Temple Buttes

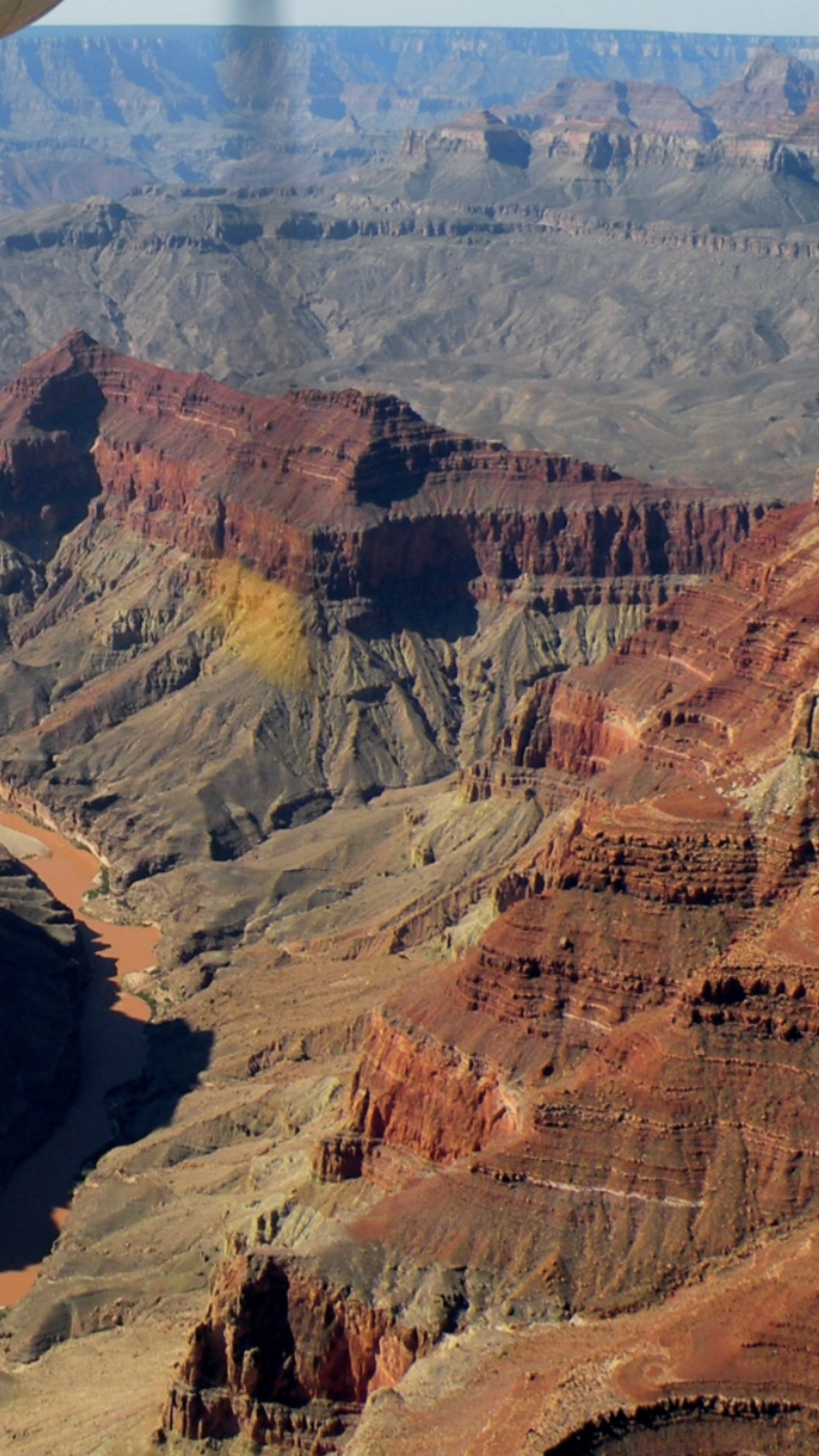
Temple Butte,
(north aspect) and
(east aspect)
Chuar Butte (east aspect)

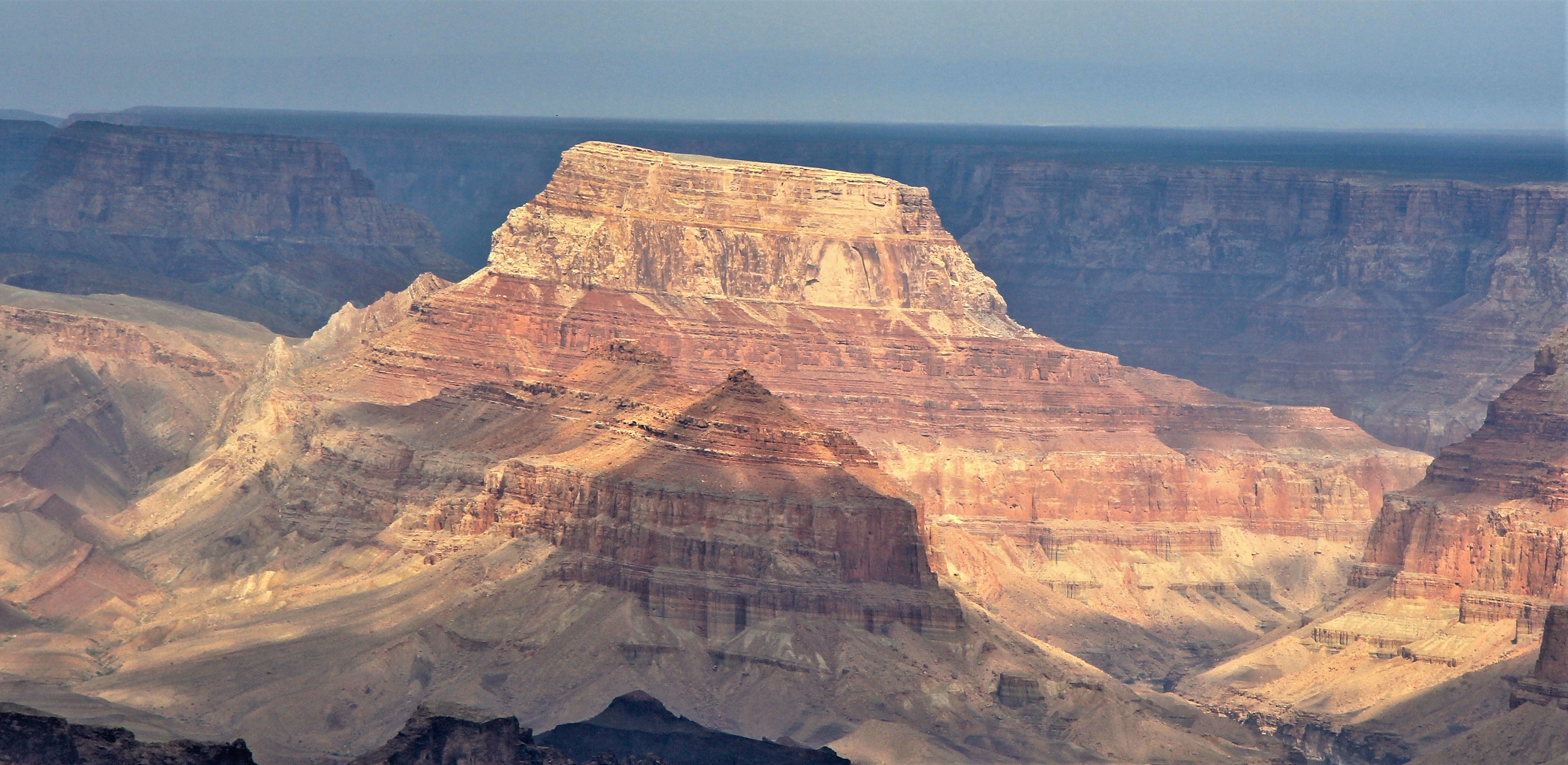
A partial west
aspect of Temple
Butte.
shows Redwall on short
Muav Limestone cliff,
on Bright Angel Shale,
on Tapeats Sandstone
lining on the gorge edges
