= Chuar Butte =

Landform in the Grand Canyon, Arizona

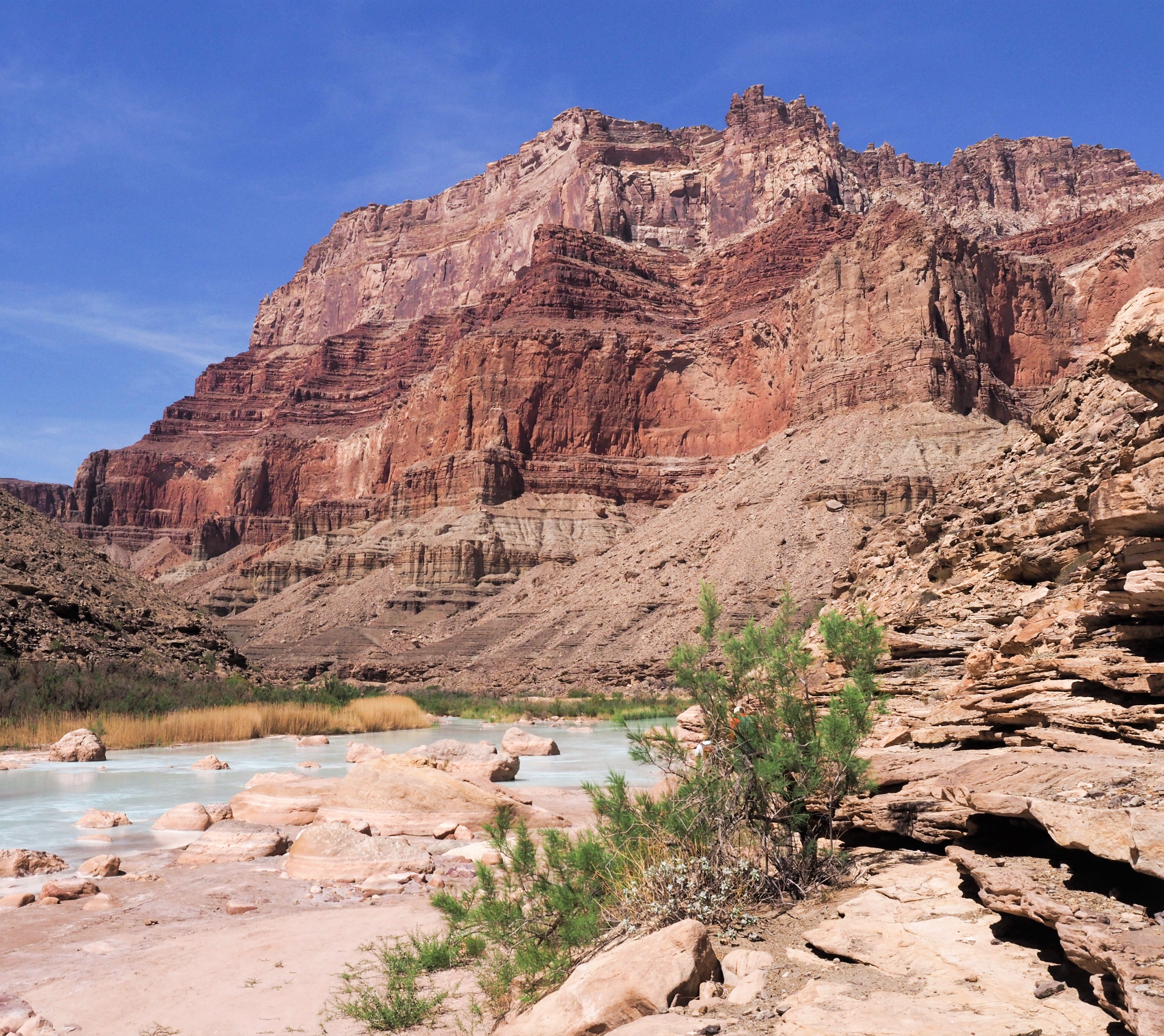
- East aspect

Highest point
- Elevation: 6,500 ft (2,000 m)
- Prominence: 1,513 ft (461 m)
- Parent peak: Gunther Castle (7,199 ft)
- Isolation: 2.95 mi (4.75 km)
- Coordinates: 36°11′45″N 111°49′29″W

Geography
- Location within Arizona Location within the United States
- Country: United States
- State: Arizona
- County: Coconino
- Protected area: Grand Canyon National Park
- Parent range: Kaibab Plateau; Colorado Plateau
- Topo map: USGS Cape Solitude

Geology
- Rock type(s): sandstone, siltstone, limestone

Climbing
- Easiest route: class 5.2 climbing

Chuar Butte is a prominent 6,500-foot-elevation (2,000-meter) summit located in the Grand Canyon, in Coconino County of northern Arizona, US. It is situated 1.5 miles northwest of Cape Solitude on the canyon's East Rim, three miles southeast of Gunther Castle, and immediately west of the confluence of the Colorado River and Little Colorado River. This position also places it where Marble Canyon ends, and the Grand Canyon begins. Topographic relief is significant as it rises nearly 3,800 feet (1,200 meters) above the river in less than one mile. According to the Köppen climate classification system, Chuar Butte is located in a cold semi-arid climate zone.

== History ==
Chuar Butte was named by John Wesley Powell for Chuarrumpeak, or Chuar-ru-um-pik, a young Kaibabits tribal chief who assisted Powell and was known among early settlers as "Chuar" for short. A variant name for this butte is Chuarooum Peak. This feature's name was officially adopted in 1906 by the U.S. Board on Geographic Names.

Chuar Butte and adjacent Temple Butte are the historical site of wreckage from the 1956 Grand Canyon mid-air collision, in which two commercial airliners collided, resulting in the deaths of all 128 on board both planes. This disaster was a catalyst that forced the government to overhaul airline regulation and to establish the Federal Aviation Administration. The site was designated a National Historic Landmark on April 22, 2014, and is in a remote area of the canyon that is only accessible to hikers.

== Geology ==
The top of Chuar Butte is composed of Permian Kaibab Limestone, which overlays cream-colored, cliff-forming, Permian Coconino Sandstone. The sandstone, which is the third-youngest of the strata in the Grand Canyon, was deposited 265 million years ago as sand dunes. Below the Coconino Sandstone is reddish, slope-forming, Permian Hermit Formation, which in turn overlays the Pennsylvanian-Permian Supai Group. Further down are strata of Mississippian Redwall Limestone, and finally Cambrian Tonto Group at river level. The Butte Fault is on the west side of Chuar Butte. Uplift along the fault has lifted the Neoproterozoic Chuar Group 3,000 feet relative to the limestone layer, exposing mudstone of the Chuar Group.

== Gallery ==
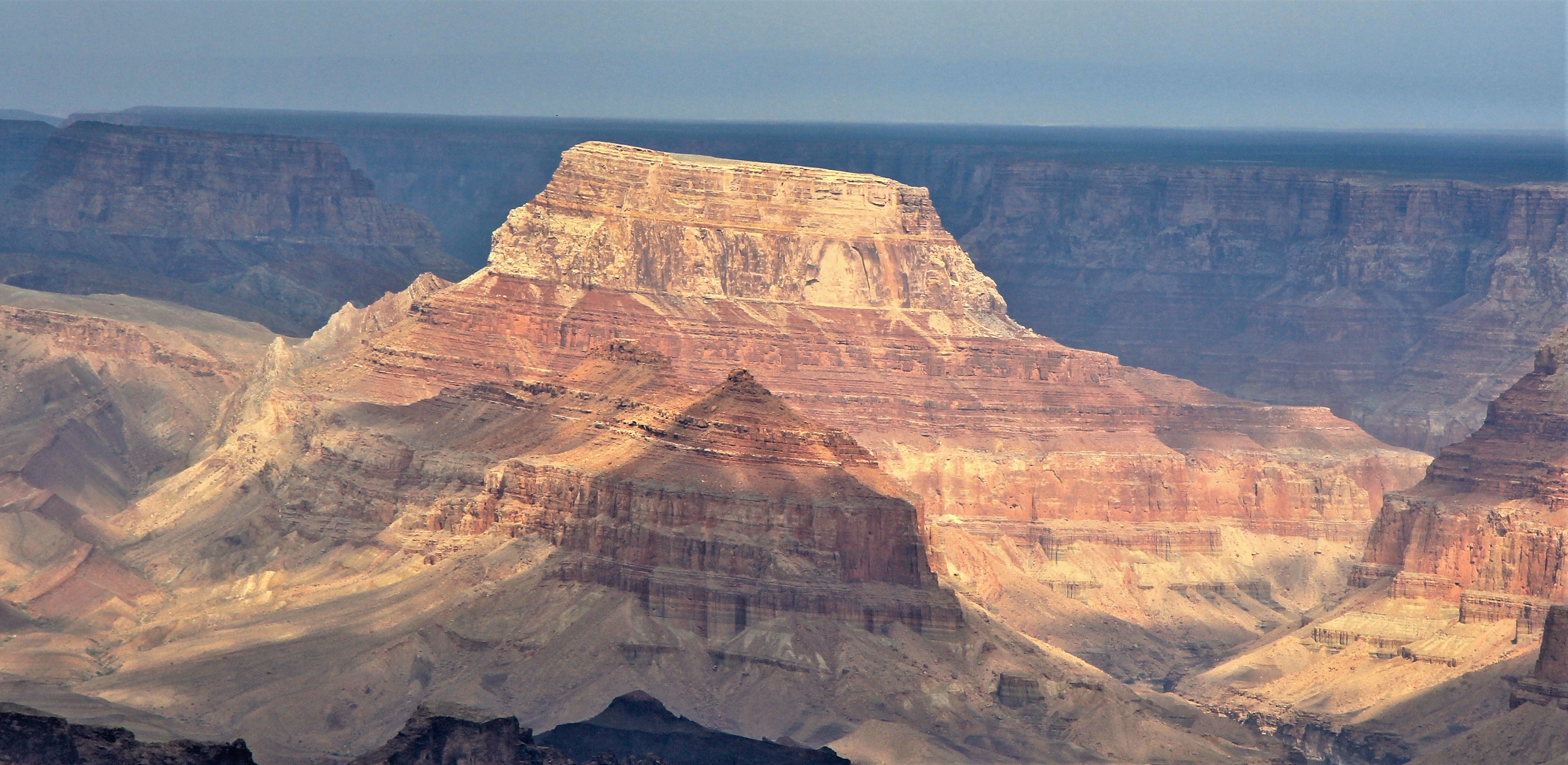
Chuar Butte illuminated, with Temple Butte below

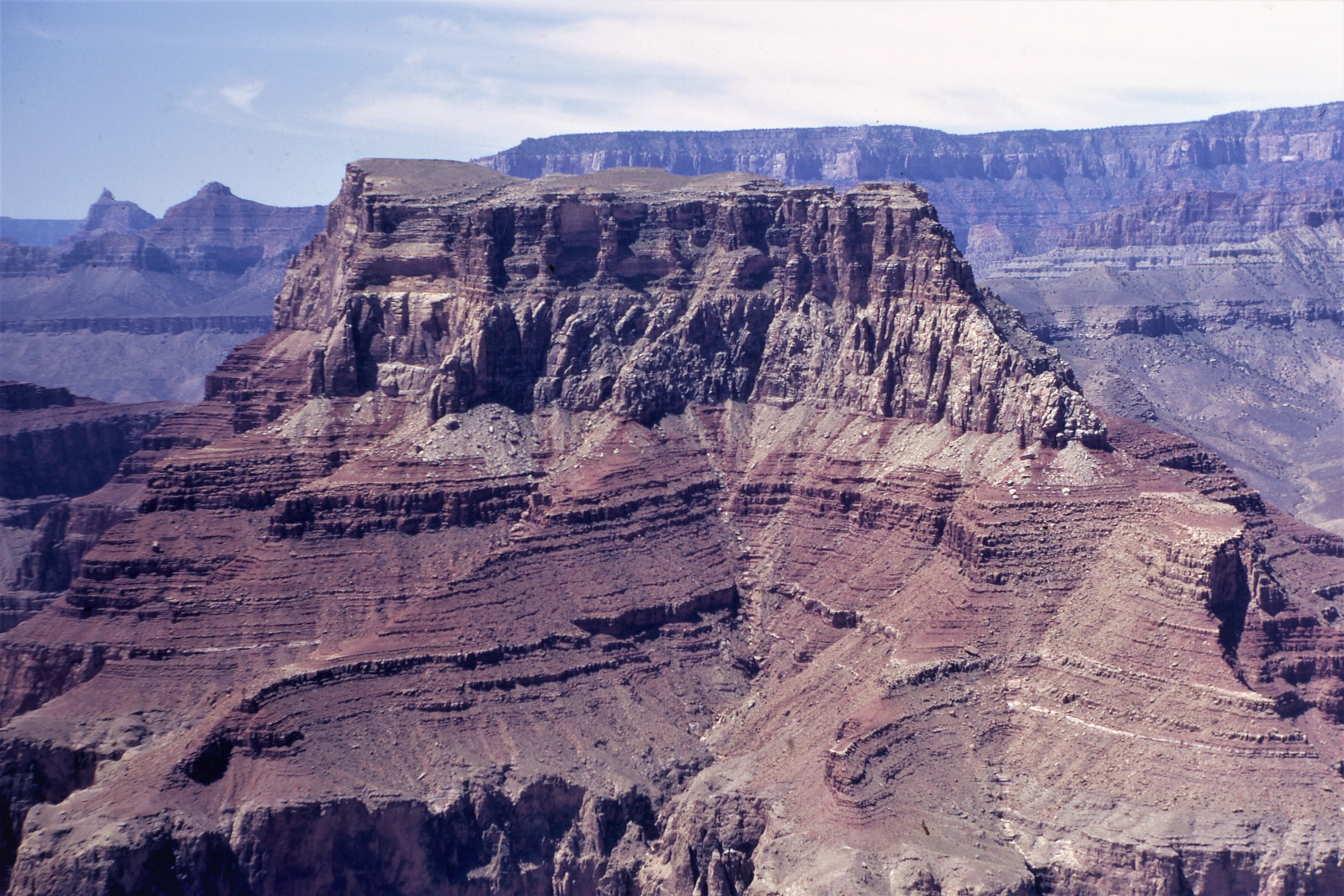
Chuar Butte from north rim of Little Colorado River

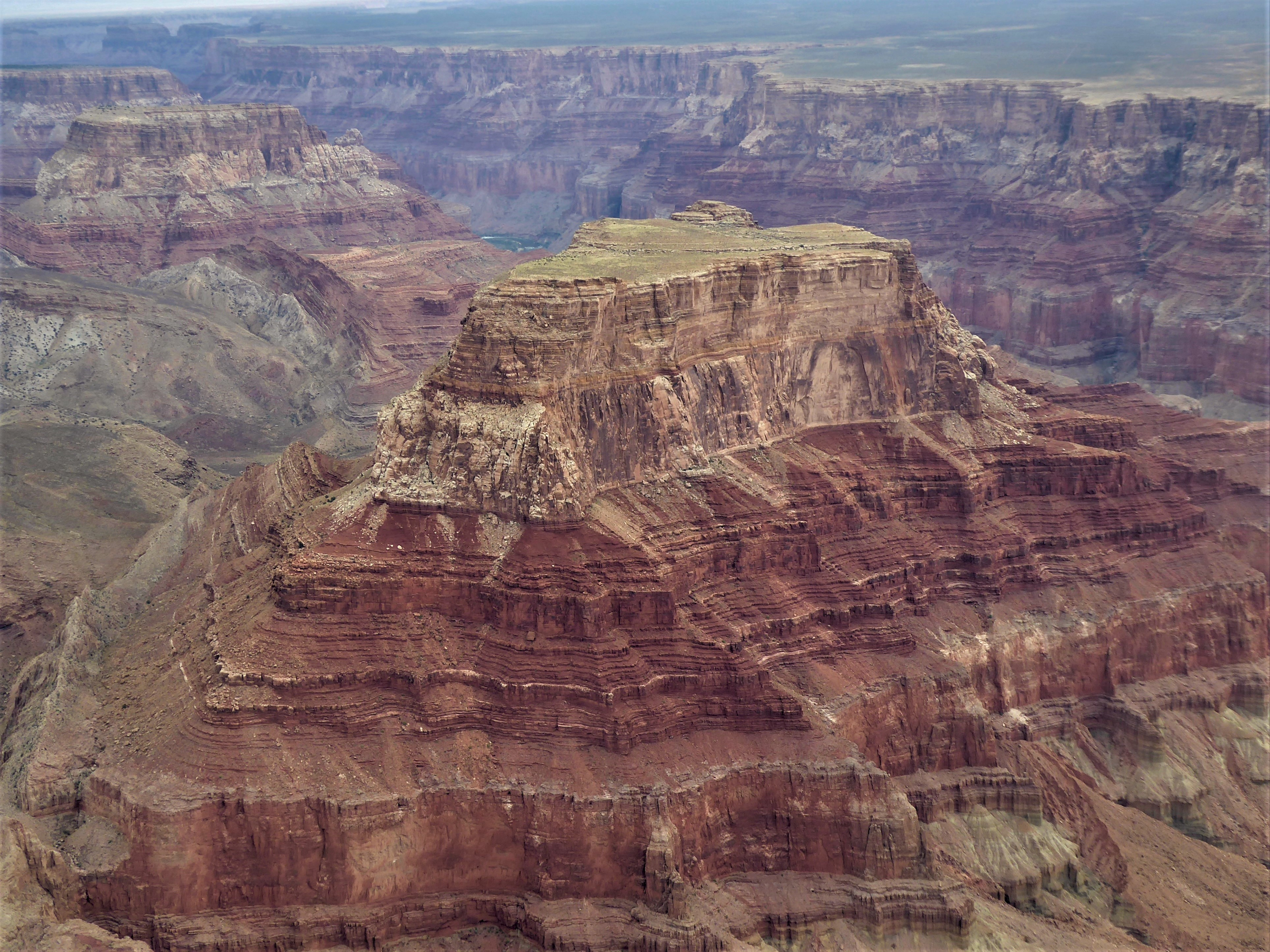
Aerial view looking north

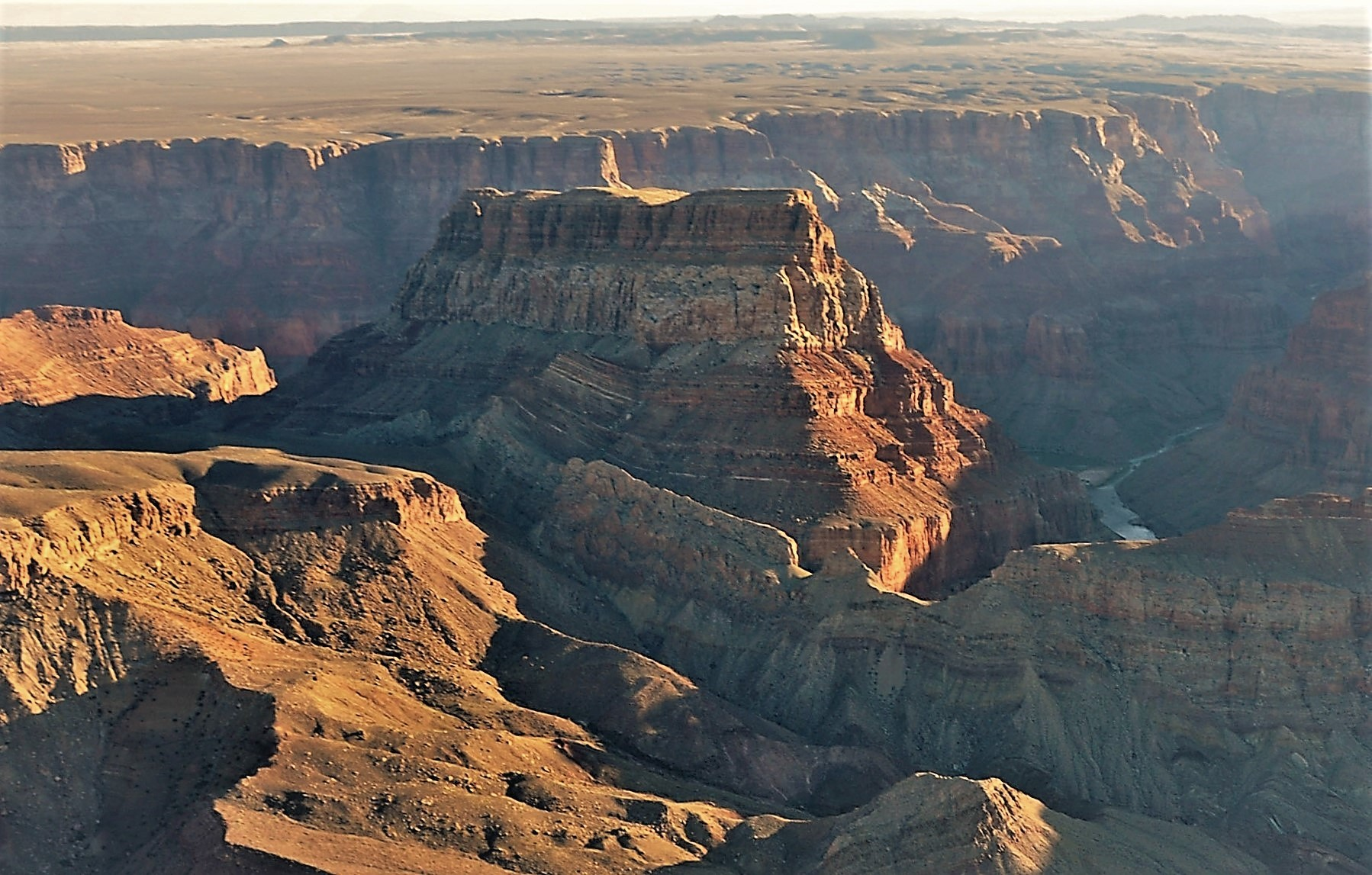
Aerial view looking northeast

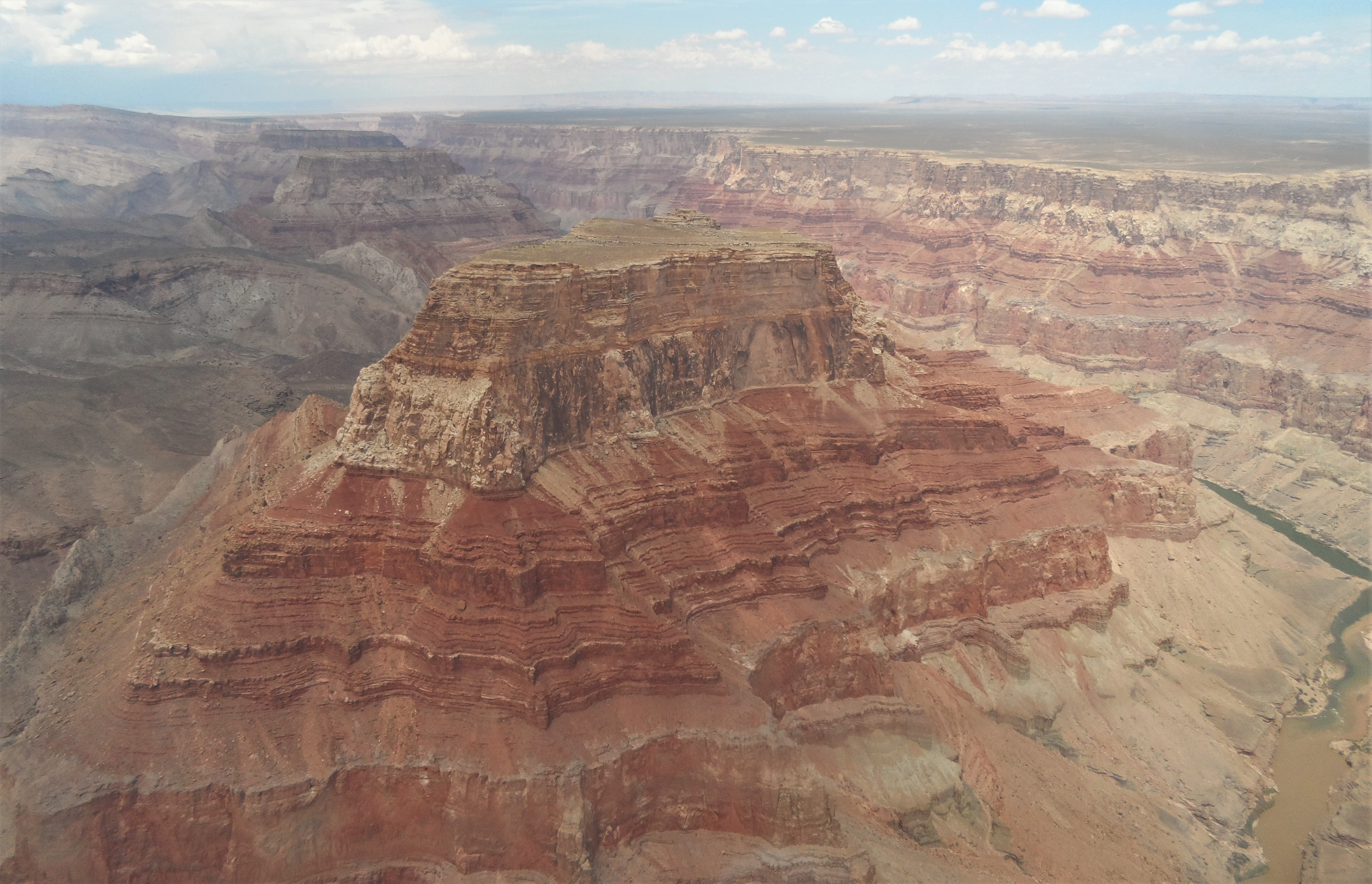
Aerial view looking north

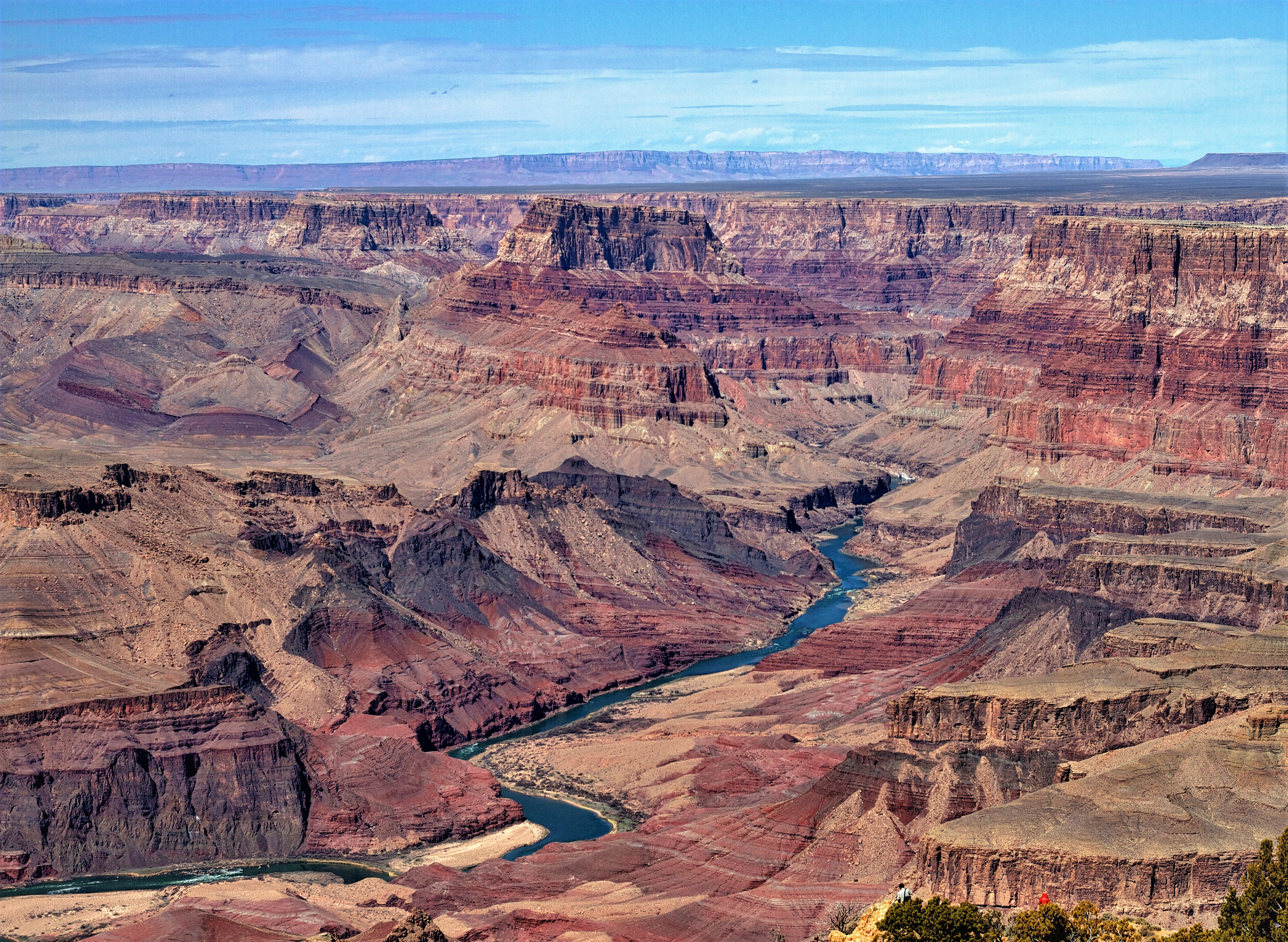
Chuar Butte centered at top, view from Desert View

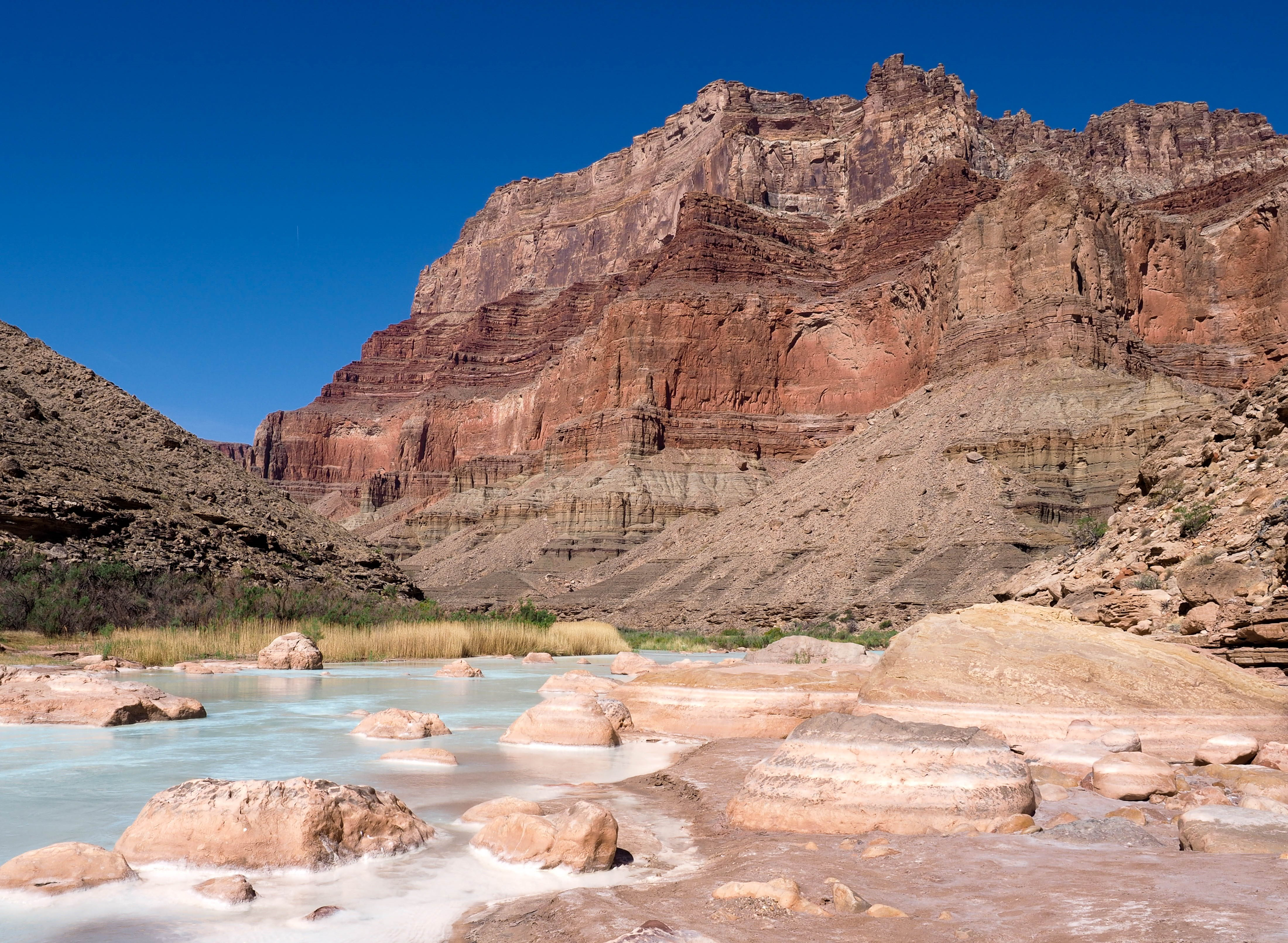
Chuar Butte with Little Colorado River

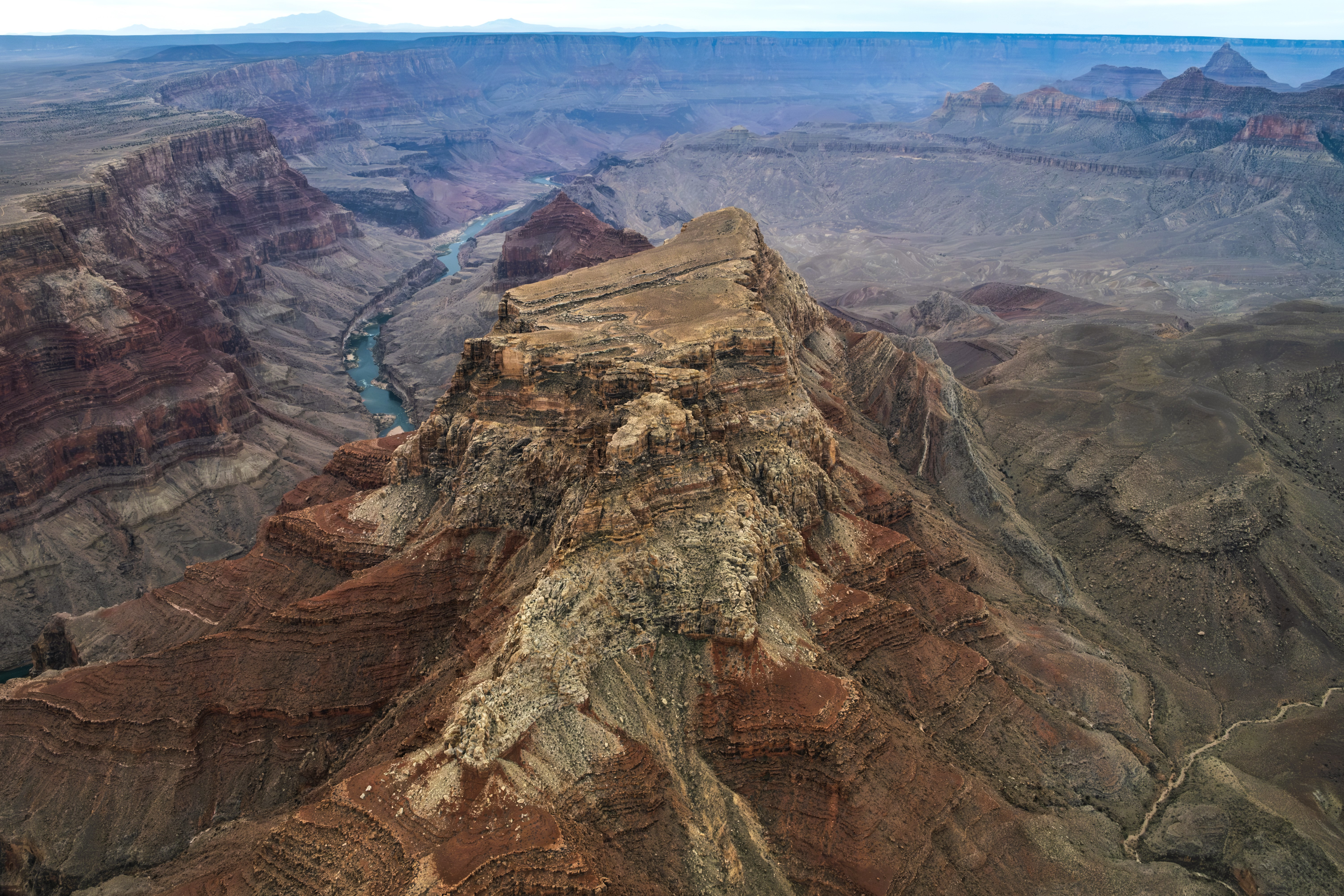
Aerial view looking south

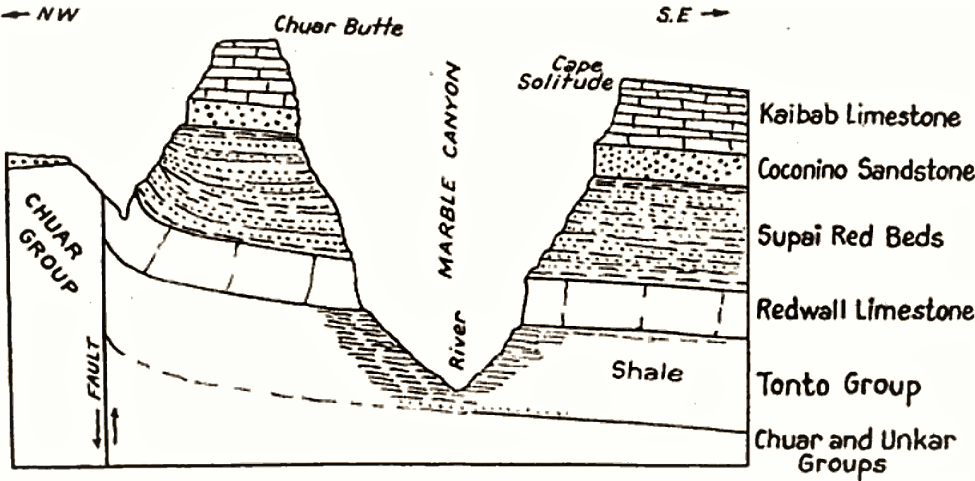

== See also ==
- Geology of the Grand Canyon area
- List of National Historic Landmarks in Arizona
- Nankoweap Mesa – (the third & north “butte” along the Butte Fault system)
