= Man's Place in Nature =

1863 book by Thomas Henry Huxley

Evidence as to Man's Place in Nature
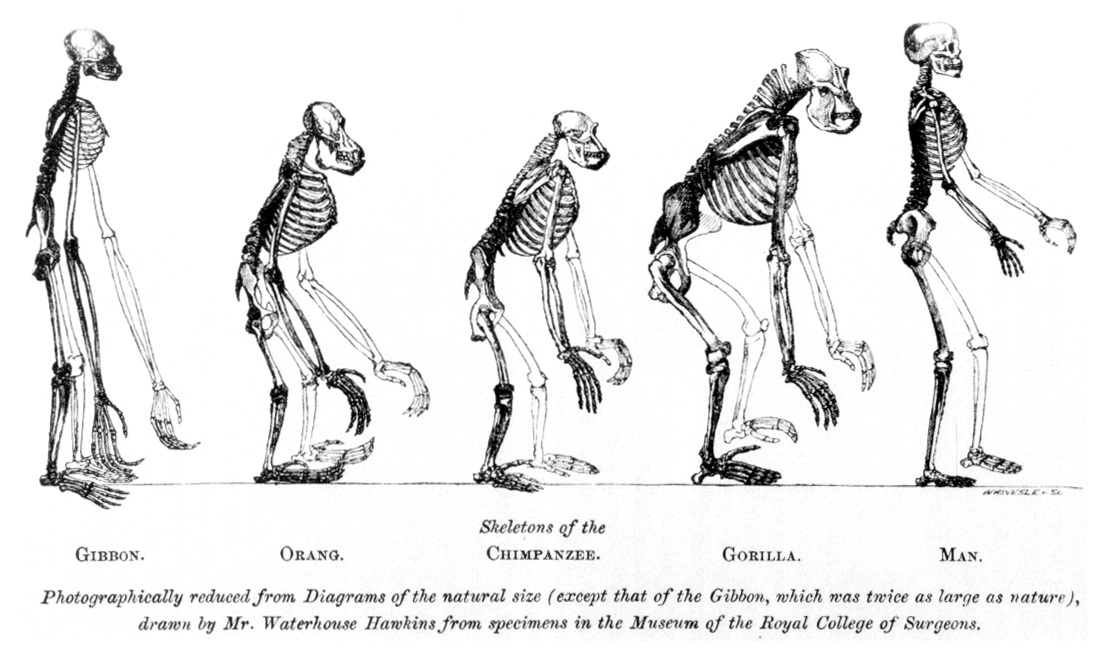
- Author: Thomas Henry Huxley
- Language: English
- Subject: Human evolution
- Genre: Science
- Publisher: Williams & Norgate
- Publication date: 1863
- Publication place: England
- Pages: 159

Evidence as to Man's Place in Nature is an 1863 book by Thomas Henry Huxley, in which he gives evidence for the evolution of humans and apes from a common ancestor. It was the first book devoted to the topic of human evolution, and discussed much of the anatomical and other evidence. Backed by this evidence, the book proposed to a wide readership that evolution applied as fully to man as to all other life.

== Precursors of the idea ==
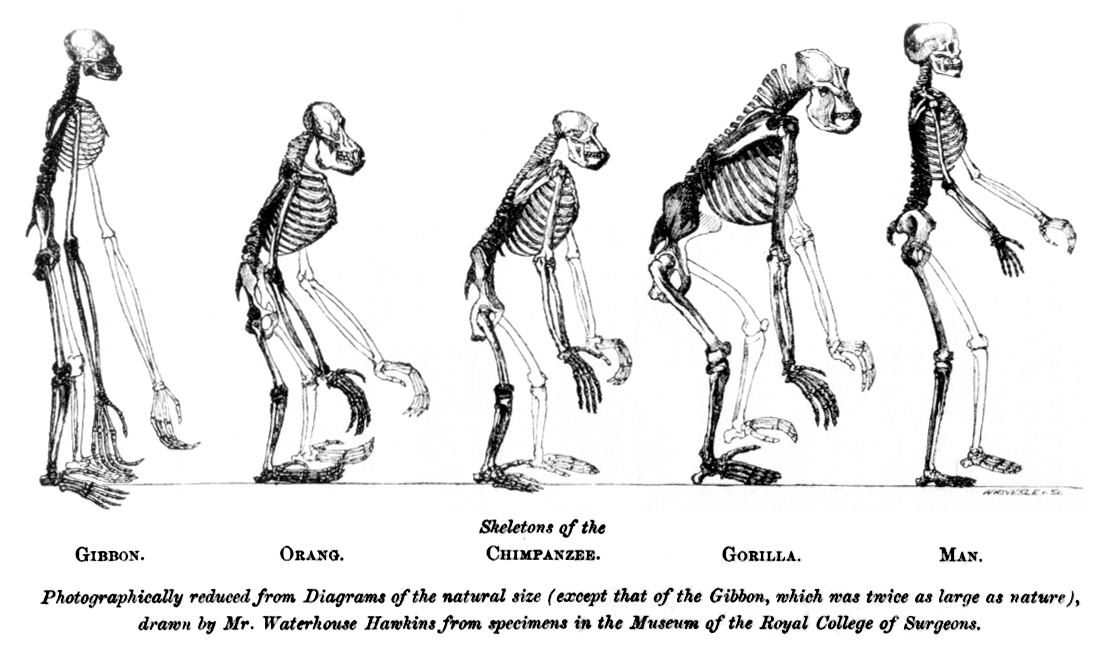
This illustration was the frontispiece. Huxley applied Darwin's ideas to humans, using comparative anatomy to show that humans and apes had a common ancestor, which challenged the theologically important idea that humans held a unique place in the universe.

In the 18th century Linnaeus and others had classified man as a primate, but without drawing evolutionary conclusions. It was Lamarck, the first to develop a coherent theory of evolution, who, in his book Philosophie zoologique, discussed human evolution in this context, but without acknowledging common ancestry. Robert Chambers in his anonymous Vestiges also suggested the point.

The book came five years after Charles Darwin and Alfred Russel Wallace announced their theory of evolution by means of natural selection, and four years after the publication of Darwin's Origin of Species. In the Origin Darwin had deliberately avoided tackling human evolution, but left a gnomic trailer: "Light will be thrown on the origin of man and his history". Darwin's sequel came eight years later, with The Descent of Man, and Selection in Relation to Sex (1871).

== Content and structure of the book ==
=== Chapters ===
I. On the natural history of the man-like Apes p1–56. This contains a summary of what was known of the great apes at that time.

II. On the relations of Man to the lower animals p57–112. This chapter and its addendum contained most of the controversial material, and is still important today.

Addendum: A succinct history of the controversy respecting the cerebral structure of Man and the apes p113–118 (set in a smaller font).

III. On some fossil remains of Man p119–159. A neanderthal skull-cap and other bones had been found, and various remains of early Homo sapiens. Huxley compares these remains with existing human races.

=== Previous publication of the content ===
As Huxley said in his Advertisement of the Reader, most of the content of his book had been presented to the public before: "The greater part of the following essays has already been published in the form of Oral Discourses, addressed to widely different audiences, during the past three years." The oral presentations began in 1860. The publications in serials included:

- 1861. On the zoological relations of Man with the lower animals.. Natural History Review (new series), p67–84.
- 1861. Man and the Apes. Letters to the Athenaeum, March 30 and September 21, p433 and 498.
- 1862. The Brain of Man and Apes. letter to Medical Times & Gazette, October 25, p449.
- 1862. On some fossil remains of Man. Proceedings of the Royal Institution of Great Britain 3 (1858–1862), p420–422.
- 1862. On some fossil remains of Man. Medical Times & Gazette 24, 159–161.

=== The central argument ===
The second chapter contains the basic evidence for man as an animal. After half a dozen preliminary pages Huxley introduces the study of development: "that every living creature commences its existence under a form different from, and simpler to, that which it eventually attains" (p74). Of course, this follows from fertilisation taking place in a single cell. He follows the embryological development of a dog, and its similarities with other vertebrates, before turning to man. "Without question... [man's] early stages of development... [are] far nearer the apes, than apes are to the dog" (p81).

Huxley next begins a comparison of the adult anatomy of apes with man, asking "Is man so different from any of these apes that he must form an order by himself?" (p85). "It is quite certain that the ape which most nearly approaches man is either the chimpanzee, or the gorilla..." (p86). "In the general proportions of the body and limbs there is a remarkable difference between the Gorilla and man (p87)... [but]... in whatever proportion the Gorilla differs from man, the other apes depart still more widely from the Gorilla and that, consequently, such differences of proportion can have no ordinal value" (p89). Put simply, Huxley rejects the idea that man should occupy an order separate from the apes. Therefore, they are primates.

Next, the skull and brains. "The difference between a Gorilla's skull and a man's are truly immense." (p92––93).... "Thus in the important matter of cranial capacity, men differ more widely from one another than they do from the apes; while the lowest apes differ as much, in proportion, from the highest, as the latter does from man" (p95). There is much more detailed comparative anatomy, leading to the same type of argument, for example: "Hence it is obvious that, greatly as the dentition of the highest ape differs from man, it differs far more widely from that of the lower and lowest apes" (p101). "Thus, whatever system of organs be studied, the comparison of their modifications in the ape series leads to one and the same result—that the structural differences which separate Man from the Gorilla and the Chimpanzee are not so great as those which separate the Gorilla from the lower apes" (p123). "But if man be separated by no greater structural barrier from the brutes than they are from each other—then it seems to follow that... there would be no rational ground for doubting that man might have originated... by the gradual modification of a man-like ape"... "At the present moment there is but one hypothesis which has any scientific existence—that propounded by Mr. Darwin" (p125).

Huxley's conclusion, that man differs from apes at the level of a family, may be compared with the opinion today that the distinction between the great apes and man is at the level of a subfamily, the Homininae or at the level of the tribe, Hominini or even at the level of a subtribe: the Hominina. The Australopithecines separate man from the great apes, and the genus Homo is almost certainly an offshoot of the early australopithecines, upright apes of the wooded savannah (see human taxonomy). The general opinion today is that man is more closely related to apes than even Huxley thought.

=== The addendum ===
Animation showing the location of the hippocampus on either side in the lower central area of the brain

The addendum to Chapter II was Huxley's account of his "Great Hippocampus Question" controversy with Owen about the comparison of human and ape brains. For the full text of the Addendum, see s:The cerebral structure of man and apes. In his Collected Essays this addendum was edited out, and is lacking in most later reprints.

A key event had already occurred in 1857 when Richard Owen presented (to the Linnean Society) his view that man was marked off from all other mammals by possessing features of the brain peculiar to the genus Homo. Having reached this opinion, Owen separated man from all other mammals in a subclass of its own. No other biologist before or since has held such an extreme view.

The subject was raised at the 1860 British Association's Oxford meeting, when Huxley flatly contradicted Owen, and promised a later demonstration of the facts.

"I redeemed that pledge by publishing, in the January number of the Natural History Review for 1861, an article wherein the truth of the three following propositions was fully demonstrated (loc cit p71):
1. That the third lobe is neither peculiar to, nor characteristic of, man, seeing that it exists in all the higher quadrumana.
2. That the posterior cornu of the lateral ventricle is neither peculiar to, nor characteristic of, man, inasmuch as it also exists in the higher quadrumana.
3. That the 'hippocampus minor' is neither peculiar to, nor characteristic of, man, as it is found in certain of the higher quadrumana."

In fact, a number of demonstrations were held in London and the provinces. In 1862 at the Cambridge meeting of the B.A. Huxley's friend William Flower gave a public dissection to show that the same structures (the posterior horn of the lateral ventricle and the hippocampus minor) were indeed present in apes. Thus was exposed one of Owen's greatest blunders, revealing Huxley as not only dangerous in debate, but also a better anatomist.

As he says, Huxley's ideas on this topic were summed up in January 1861 in the first issue (new series) of his own journal, the Natural History Review: "the most violent scientific paper he had ever composed". The substance of this paper was presented in 1863 as chapter 2 of Man's place in Nature, with the addendum giving his account of the Owen/Huxley controversy about the ape brain.

In due course, Owen did finally concede that there was something that could be called a hippocampus minor in the apes, but said that it was much less developed and that such a presence did not detract from the overall distinction of smaller brain size. Interpreted as an attempt to defend his original decision, Owen's point on brain size was answered by Huxley in Man's Place (excerpt above), and repeated when he wrote a section comparing ape and human brains for the second edition of Darwin's Descent of Man:

"Again, as respects the question of absolute size, it is established that the difference between the largest and the smallest healthy human brain is greater than the difference between the smallest healthy human brain and the largest chimpanzee's or orangutan's brain." and "A character which is thus variable within the limits of a single group can have no great taxonomic value."

The extended argument on the ape brain, partly in debate and partly in print, backed by dissections and demonstrations, was a landmark in Huxley's career. It was highly important in asserting his dominance of comparative anatomy, and in the long run more influential in establishing evolution amongst biologists than was the debate with Samuel Wilberforce. It also marked the start of Owen's decline in the esteem of his fellow biologists.

=== Structure of the book ===
The first edition of Man's Place in Nature is arranged as follows: 8vo, 9x5^{7/8} inches (23x15 cm), [viii]+159+[i]+8ads. Bound in dark green pebbled cloth with blind-stamped borders on boards, gilt lettering on spine as follows: head: Man's place in nature / [rule] / T.H. Huxley; foot: Williams and Norgate. Dark brick red advertisement end-papers front and back, with Williams & Norgate's publications. Frontispiece diagram of ape skeletons, photographically reproduced, after drawings by Waterhouse Hawkins, from specimens in the Museum of the Royal College of Surgeons. Title bears Williams & Norgate's medallion logo; date is 1863.

=== Translations and other editions ===
- English: The original edition was reprinted in 1864. The American edition was first published in New York by Appleton in 1863. The type was reset and the format was slightly smaller than the London edition: 8vo, 8^{1/4}x5^{1/4} inches (21x13.3 cm), ix+9–184+8ads+[ii].
- German: translated by Victor Carus as Zeugnisse für die Stellung des Menschen in der Natur. Vieweg & Sohn, Braunschweig (Brunswick). 1863
- Russian: translated by Vladimir Kovalevskii, published at St Petersburg. There were two separate editions of Man's Place prepared before Darwin's Origin was translated.
- French: Paris 1868 and 1910.
- Italian: Milan 1869.
- Polish: Warsaw 1874.
- Chinese: Shanghai 1935.
- Japanese: Tokyo 1940.

== Comparison with Lyell's Antiquity of Man ==
In assessing Huxley's work, the content of Charles Lyell's The Antiquity of Man should be considered. It was published in early February 1863, just before Huxley's work, and covered the discoveries of traces of early man in the palaeolithic (Pleistocene). However, Lyell avoided a definitive statement on human evolution. Darwin wrote: "I am fearfully disappointed at Lyell's excessive caution" and "The book is a mere 'digest' ". In other respects Antiquity was a success. It sold well, and it "shattered the tacit agreement that mankind should be the sole preserve of theologians and historians". But when Lyell wrote that it remained a profound mystery how the huge gulf between man and beast could be bridged, Darwin wrote "Oh!" in the margin of his copy. For this reason, despite its merits, Lyell's book did not anticipate the crucial arguments which Huxley presented.

== Comparison with the Descent of Man ==
Eight years after Man's Place, Darwin's Descent of Man was published. In it Darwin faced the same task of persuading the reader of man's evolutionary heritage. He took, in Chapter 1 The evidence of the descent of man from some lower form, an approach which made good use of his vast supply of information on the natural history of mammals.

Darwin starts: "It is notorious that man is constructed on the same general type or model as other mammals..." (p6) He goes on to discuss infections by similar diseases, the similarity of non-contagious diseases compared with monkeys, the liking of monkeys for tea, coffee and alcohol. He describes baboons grumpily holding their aching heads the day after a drinking session (p7). He was aware that closely related animals always seemed to suffer from closely related parasites. He follows Huxley in his account of man's embryonic development, and then considers the evidence of vestigial organs, which he (and Huxley) called rudiments (p11). The discussion of a rare human hereditary condition permitting its possessors to move their scalps is connected to the regular use of this ability in many monkeys. The fine lanugo, a covering of hair on the human foetus, is thought by Darwin to be a vestige of the first permanent coat of hair in those mammals which are born hairy. The existence of non-erupting third molars is connected to the shortening of the jaw in humans, and, like the shortened caecum in the alimentary canal, is an adaptation to the human change of diet from full herbivory (humans are omnivores) (p20––21).

"The bearing of the three great classes of facts now given is unmistakable... [the facts] are intelligible if we admit their descent from a common ancestor, together with their subsequent adaptation to diversified conditions... Thus we can understand how it has come to pass that man and all other vertebrate animals have been constructed on the same general model, why they pass through the same early stages of development, and why they retain certain rudiments in common. Consequently we ought frankly to admit their community of descent" (p25).

Later, in Chapter 6, Darwin produces his famous passage on the birthplace and antiquity of man, quoting the Chimpanzee and Gorilla as evidence that "...as these two species are now man's nearest allies, it is somewhat more probable that our early progenitors lived on the African continent than elsewhere" (p155).

== See also ==
- Great Hippocampus Question
- March of Progress
