= Great Hippocampus Question =

19th-century scientific controversy

The Great Hippocampus Question was a 19th-century scientific controversy about the anatomy of ape and human uniqueness. The dispute between Thomas Henry Huxley and Richard Owen became central to the scientific debate on human evolution that followed Charles Darwin's 1859 publication of On the Origin of Species. The name comes from the title of a satire the Reverend Charles Kingsley wrote about the arguments, which in modified form appeared as "the great hippopotamus test" in Kingsley's 1863 book for children, The Water-Babies, A Fairy Tale for a Land Baby. Together with other humorous skits on the topic, this helped to spread and popularise Darwin's ideas on evolution.

The key point that Owen asserted was that only humans had part of the brain then known as the hippocampus minor (now called the calcar avis), and that this gave us our unique abilities. Careful dissection eventually showed that apes and monkeys also have a hippocampus minor.

== Background ==
In October 1836 Charles Darwin returned from the Beagle voyage with fossil collections which the anatomist Richard Owen described, contributing to the inception of Darwin's theory of natural selection. Darwin outlined his theory in an Essay of 1844, and discussed transmutation with his friend Joseph Dalton Hooker. He did not tell Owen, who as the up-and-coming "English Cuvier" held the conventional belief that every species was uniquely created and perfectly adapted. Owen's brilliance and political skills made him a leading figure in the scientific establishment, developing ideas of divine archetypes produced by vague secondary laws similar to a form of theistic evolution, while emphasising the differences separating man from ape. At the end of 1844 the anonymous book Vestiges of the Natural History of Creation brought wide public interest in transmutation of species and the idea that humans were descended from apes, and after a slow initial response, strong condemnation from the scientific establishment.

Darwin discussed his interest in transmutation with friends including Charles Lyell, and Hooker eventually read Darwin's Essay in 1847. When Thomas Henry Huxley savagely reviewed the latest edition of Vestiges in 1854, Darwin wrote to him, making friends while cautiously admitting to being "almost as unorthodox about species". Huxley had become increasingly irritated by Owen's condescension and manipulation, and having gained a teaching position at the school of mining, began openly attacking Owen's work.

== Hippocampus minor ==
In 1564 a prominent feature on the floor of the lateral ventricles of the brain was named the hippocampus by Aranzi as its curved shape on each side supposedly reminded him of a seahorse, the Hippocampus (though Mayer mistakenly used the term hippopotamus in 1779, and was followed by several others until 1829). At that same time a ridge on the occipital horn was named the calcar avis, but in 1786 this was renamed the hippocampus minor, with the hippocampus being called the hippocampus major.

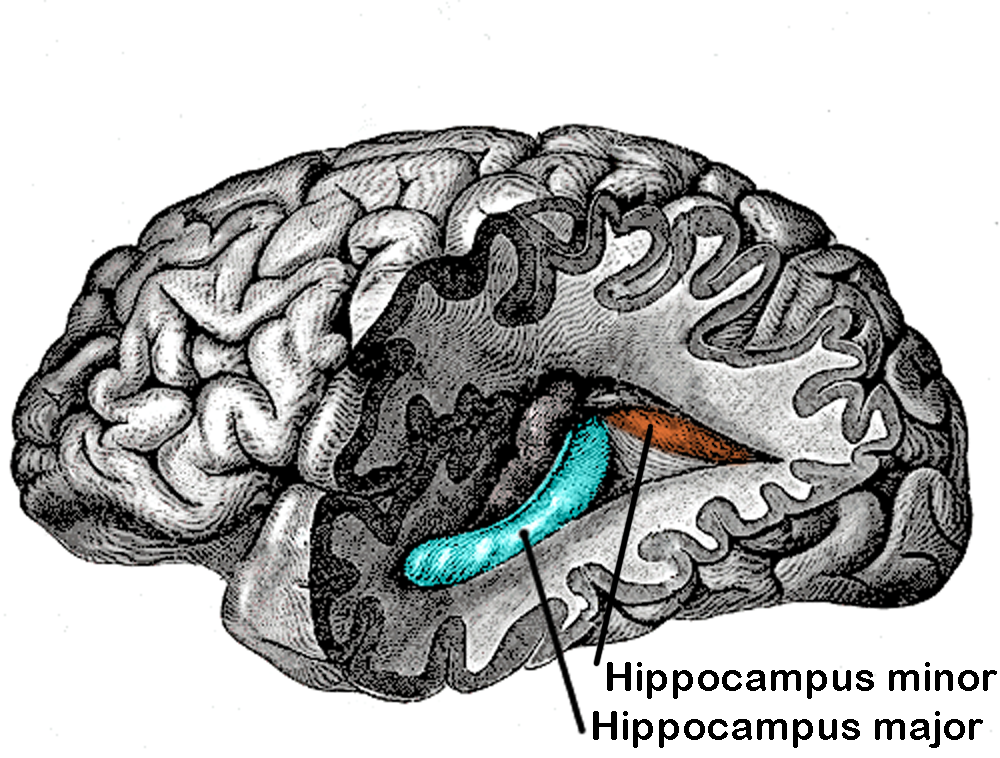
The hippocampus minor is a small fold on the occipital horn towards the back of the brain (to the right) to the rear of the hippocampus major which forms a curved ridge on each side of the lower central area.

Richard Owen presented several papers on the anatomical differences between apes and humans, arguing that they had been created separately and stressing the impossibility of apes being transmuted into men. In 1857 he went even further, presenting an authoritative paper to the Linnean Society of London on his anatomical studies of primate brains and asserting that humans were not merely a distinct biological order of primates, as had been accepted by great anatomists such as Carl Linnaeus and Georges Cuvier, but a separate sub-class of mammalia, distinct from all the other primates and mammals generally. Owen supported his argument with a figure by himself of a South American monkey, a figure of a Khoekhoe woman's brain by Friedrich Tiedemann, and of a chimpanzee's brain by Jacobus Schroeder van der Kolk and Willem Vrolik.

While Owen conceded the "all-pervading similitude of structure—every tooth, every bone, strictly homologous" which made it difficult for anatomists to determine the difference between man and ape, he based his new classification on three characteristics which to him distinguished mankind's "highest form of brain", the most important being his claim that only the human brain has a hippocampus minor. To Owen in 1857, this feature together with the extent to which the "posterior lobe" projected beyond the cerebellum and the presence of the posterior horn were how man "fulfills his destiny as the supreme master of this earth and of the lower creation." Charles Darwin commented, "Owen's is a grand Paper; but I cannot swallow Man making a division as distinct from a Chimpanzee, as an ornithorhynchus from a Horse: I wonder what a Chimpanzee wd. say to this?". Owen repeated the paper as the Rede Lecture at the University of Cambridge on 10 May 1859 when he was the first to be given an honorary degree by the university.

To Thomas Henry Huxley the claim about the hippocampus minor appeared to be a significant blunder by Owen, and Huxley began systematically dissecting the brains of monkeys, determined that "before I have done with that mendacious humbug I will nail him out, like a kite to a barn door, an example to all evil doers." He did not discuss this in public at this stage, but continued to attack Owen's other ideas, aiming to undermine Owen's status. At his 17 June 1858 Royal Institution Croonian Lecture "On the Theory of the Vertebrate Skull", Huxley directly challenged Owen's central idea of archetypes shown by homology, with Owen in the audience. Huxley's aim was to overcome the domination of science by wealthy clergymen led by Owen, in order to create a professional salaried scientific civil service and make science secular. Under Darwin's influence he took up transmutation as a way of dividing science from theology, and in January 1859 argued that "it is as respectable to be modified monkey as modified dirt".

=== Owen and Huxley debate human and ape brain structure ===
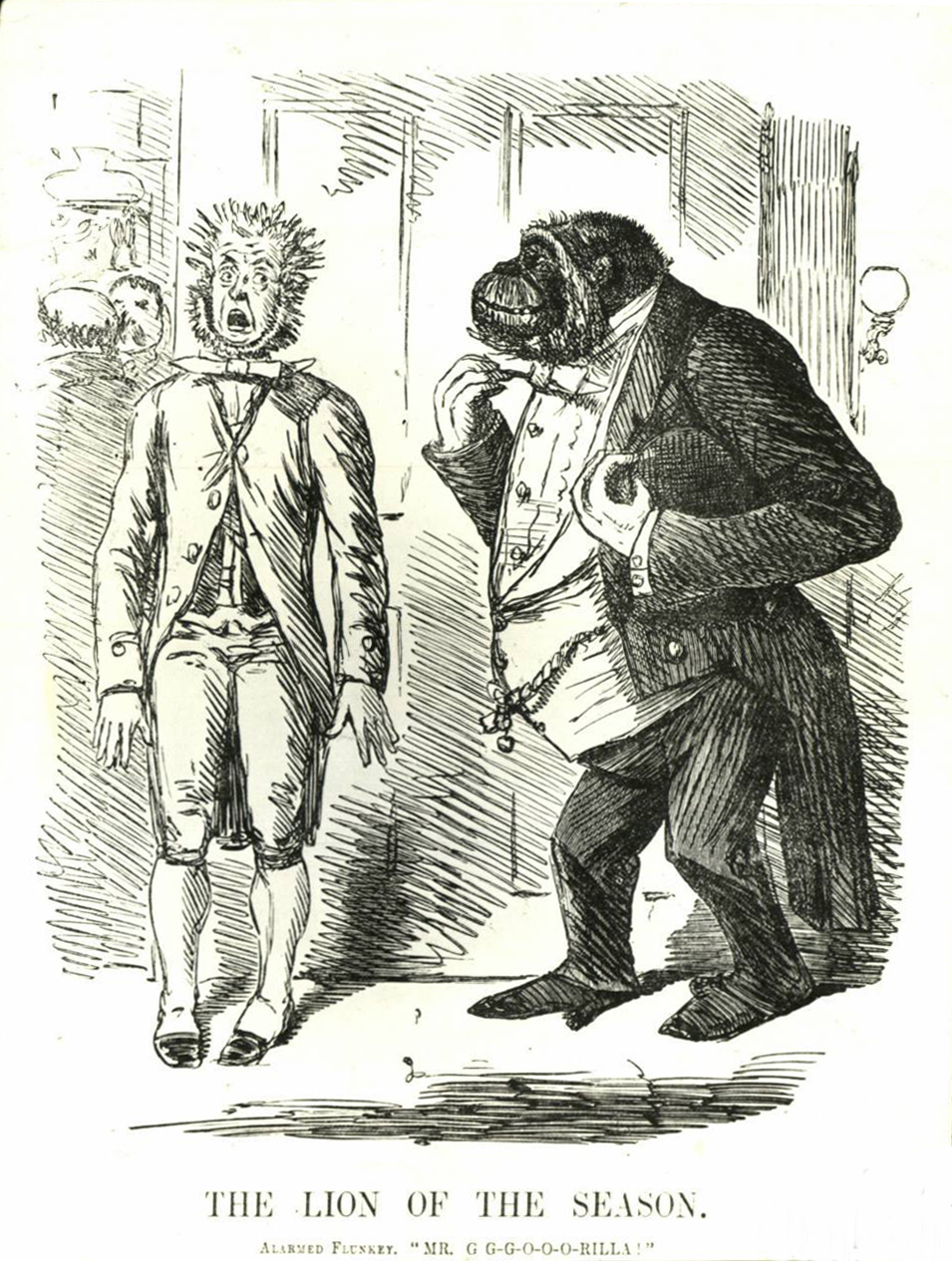
Following publication of Darwin's theory, ape ancestry became a fashionable talking point: in May 1861, an "alarmed flunkey" stammers in announcing "Mr G-G-G-O-O-O-Rilla.

Huxley was among the friends rallying round the publication of Darwin's On the Origin of Species, and was sharpening his "beak and claws" to disembowel "the curs who will bark and yelp". Charles Kingsley was sent a review copy, and told Darwin that he had "long since, from watching the crossing of domesticated animals and plants, learnt to disbelieve the dogma of the permanence of species." Darwin was delighted that this "celebrated author and divine" had "gradually learnt to see that it is just as noble a conception of the Deity to believe that He created a few original forms capable of self-development into other and needful forms, as to believe that He required a fresh act of creation to supply the voids caused by the action of His laws."

While reviews were by custom anonymous, their authors were usually known. Huxley's reviews of On the Origin of Species irritated Owen, whose own anonymous review in April praised himself and his own axiom of the continuous operation of the ordained becoming of living things, took offence at the way the creationist position had been depicted, and complained that his own pre-eminence had been ignored. Owen bitterly attacked Huxley, Hooker and Darwin, but also signalled acceptance of a kind of evolution as a teleological plan in a continuous "ordained becoming", with new species appearing by natural birth.

The dispute between Huxley and Owen over human uniqueness began in public at the 1860 Oxford evolution debate, during a meeting of the British Association for the Advancement of Science in Oxford on Thursday 28 June 1860. After Charles Daubeny's paper "On the Final Causes of the Sexuality of Plants with Particular Reference to Mr. Darwin's Work", the chairman asked Huxley for comments, but he declined as he thought the public venue inappropriate. Owen then spoke of facts which would enable the public to "come to some conclusions ... of the truth of Mr. Darwin's theory", reportedly arguing that "the brain of the gorilla was more different from that of man than from that of the lowest primate particularly because only man had a posterior lobe, a posterior horn, and a hippocampus minor." In response, Huxley flatly but politely "denied altogether that the difference between the brain of the gorilla and man was so great" in a "direct and unqualified contradiction" of Owen, citing previous studies as well as promising to provide detailed support for his position.

Anguish over the death of his son of scarlet fever in September 1860 pushed Huxley to the brink, from which Kingsley rescued him by a series of letters. Huxley put his fury over the death into composing a paper which violently assaulted Owen's ideas and professional reputation. It was published in January 1861 in the first issue of Huxley's relaunched Natural History Review magazine, and presented citations, quotations and letters from leading anatomists to attack Owen's three claims, aiming to prove him "guilty of wilful and deliberate falsehood" by citing Owen himself, and (with less clear cut justification) the anatomists whose illustrations Owen had used in the 1857 paper. While readily agreeing that the human brain differed from that of apes in size, proportions and complexity of convolutions, Huxley played the significance of these features down, and argued that to a lesser extent these also differed between the "highest" and "lowest" human races. Darwin congratulated Huxley on this "smasher" against the "canting humbug" Owen. From February to May Huxley delivered a very popular series of sixpenny lectures for working men at the School of Mines where he taught, on "The Relation of Man to the Rest of the Animal Kingdom". He told his wife that "My working men stick by me wonderfully, the house being fuller than ever last night. By next Friday evening they will all be convinced that they are monkeys."

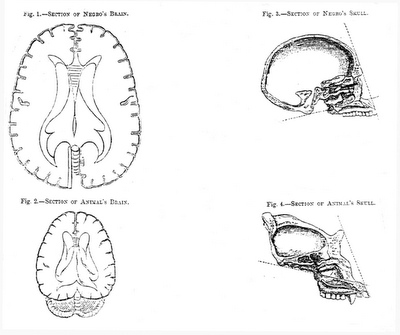
Owen's illustration of the brains of The Gorilla and the Negro

Gorillas became the topic of the day with the return of the explorer Paul Du Chaillu. Owen arranged for him to speak and display his collections on stage at a spectacular Royal Geographical Society meeting on 25 February, and followed this by giving a lecture at the Royal Institution on 19 March on the brains of The Gorilla and the Negro, asserting that the dispute was one of interpretation rather than fact, and hedging his previous claim by stating that humans alone had a hippocampus minor "as defined in human anatomy". This lecture was published in the Athenæum on 23 March with unlabelled and inaccurate illustrations, and Huxley's response in the next issue a week later, Man and the Apes, ridiculed Owen's use of these illustrations and failure to mention the findings of anatomists that the three structures were present in animals. In the following week's issue Owen's letter blamed "the Artist" for the illustrations, but claimed that the argument was correct and referred the reader to his 1858 paper. In the Athenæum of 13 April Huxley responded to this repetition of the claim by writing that "Life is too short to occupy oneself with the slaying of the slain more than once."

Each Saturday, Darwin read the latest ripostes in the Athenæum. Owen tried to smear Huxley by portraying him as an "advocate of man's origins from a transmuted ape", and one of his contributions was titled "Ape-Origin of Man as Tested by the Brain". This backfired, as Huxley had already delighted Darwin by speculating on "pithecoid man" (ape-like man), and was glad of the invitation to publicly turn the anatomy of brain structure into a question of human ancestry. Darwin egged him on from Down, writing "Oh Lord what a thorn you must be in the poor dear man's side". Huxley told Darwin's friend Joseph Dalton Hooker, "Owen occupied an entirely untenable position ... The fact is he made a prodigious blunder in commencing the attack, and now his only chance is to be silent and let people forget the exposure. I do not believe that in the whole history of science there is a case of any man of reputation getting himself into such a contemptible position. He will be the laughing-stock of all the continental anatomists."

=== Public interest and satire ===
This very public slanging match attracted wide attention, and humorists were quick to take up the opportunity for satire. Punch featured the issue several times that year, notably on 18 May 1861 when a cartoon under the heading Monkeyana showed a standing gorilla with a sign parodying Josiah Wedgwood's anti-slavery slogan "Am I Not A Man And A Brother?". This was accompanied by a satirical poem by "Gorilla" at the zoo asking to be told if he was "A man in ape's shape, An anthropoid ape, Or monkey deprived of his tail?", and noting:

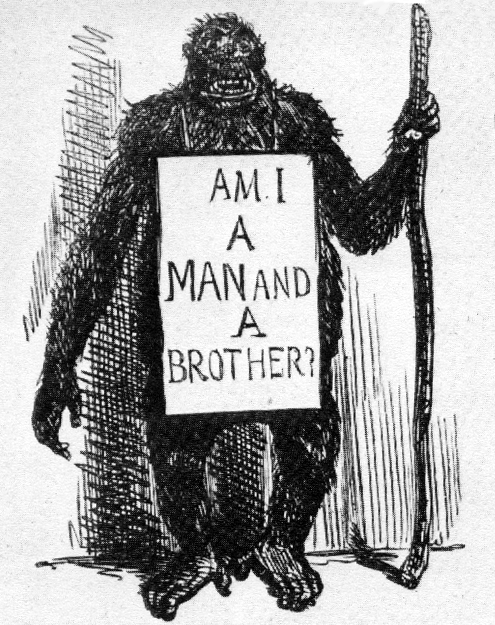
Am I A Man And A Brother?

Says Owen, you can see
The brain of Chimpanzee
Is always exceedingly small,
With the hindermost "horn"
Of extremity shorn,
And no "Hippocampus" at all.

It then recounts Huxley's ripostes, and:

Next Huxley replies,
That Owen he lies,
And garbles his Latin quotation;
That his facts are not new,
His mistakes not a few.
Detrimental to his reputation.

"To twice slay the slain,"
By dint of the Brain,
(Thus Huxley concludes his review)
Is but labour in vain,
Unproductive of gain.
And so I shall bid you "Adieu!"

— Gorilla (Sir Philip Egerton), Monkeyana.

The poem was actually by the eminent palaeontologist Sir Philip Egerton who, as a trustee of the Royal College of Surgeons and the British Museum, acted as Owen's patron. When a delighted Huxley found out who the author of the piece was, he thought it "speaks volumes for Owen's perfect success in damning himself."

In the second issue of Huxley's Natural History Review, an article by George Rolleston on the orangutan brain showed the features that Owen claimed apes lacked, and when Owen responded in a letter to the Annals and Magazine of Natural History that the issue was a matter of definition rather than fact, Huxley made a public dissection of a spider monkey that had died at the zoo, to support his case. In the following issue John Marshall provided detailed measurements making the same point about the chimpanzee, as well as explaining how a chimpanzee's brain could be distorted by not being properly preserved and removed from the skull, so that it would look like the one in Owen's illustration.

== The Great Hippocampus Question ==
The debate continued in 1862. A detailed paper by William Henry Flower in the prestigious journal, the Philosophical Transactions of the Royal Society, reviewed the earlier literature and presented his own studies based on having dissected sixteen species of primates, including prosimians, monkeys and an orangutan. Having stated at the outset that he had no opinion on transmutation or the origin of humans, he refuted Owen's three claims, and went further, stating that in relation to the mass of the brain, the hippocampus minor was proportionately largest in the marmoset, and proportionately smallest in mankind. The paper used terms recently coined by Huxley, and Flower was one of his close colleagues. Huxley presented more evidence against Owen in his Natural History Review. The Dutch anatomists Jacobus Schroeder van der Kolk and Willem Vrolik found that Owen had repeatedly used their 1849 illustration of a chimpanzee's brain to support his arguments, and to prevent the public from being misled they dissected the brain of an orangutan that had died in the Amsterdam zoo, reporting at a meeting of the Royal Netherlands Academy of Arts and Sciences that the three features Owen claimed were unique to humans were present in this ape. They admitted that their earlier illustration was incorrect due to the way they had removed the brain for inspection, and suggested that Owen had become "lost" and "fell into a trap" in debating against Darwin. Huxley reprinted the report, in French, in his Review. His confrontations with Owen went on.

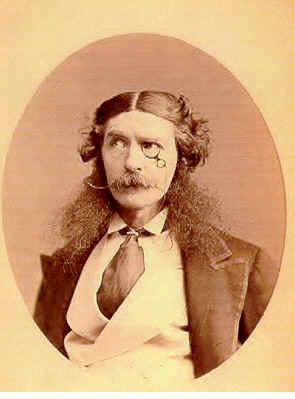
Lord Dundreary, as featured in the play Our American Cousin, noted for its association with the Abraham Lincoln assassination in 1865

At the 1862 British Association meeting in Cambridge that year, Owen presented two papers opposing Darwin: one claimed that the adaptations of the Aye-aye disproved evolution, and the second paper reiterated Owen's claims about human brains being unique, as well as discussing the question of whether apes have toes or thumbs. Huxley said Owen appeared to be "lying & shuffling", and Huxley's allies presented successive attacks on Owen. This was the first British Association annual meeting attended by Charles Kingsley, and during the meeting he produced a privately printed satirical skit on the argument, "a little squib for circulation among his friends" written in the style of the then popular stage character Lord Dundreary, a good natured but brainless aristocrat known for huge bushy sideburns and for mangling proverbs or sayings in "Dundrearyisms". The skit was titled Speech of Lord Dundreary in Section D, on Friday Last, On the Great Hippocampus Question.

we were very much delighted, and I may say, quite interested, to find that we had all hippopotamuses in our brains. Of course they're right, you know, because seeing's believing.
Certainly, I never felt one in mine; but perhaps it's dead, and so didn't stir, and then of course, it don't count, you know. .... every one has brains in his head, unless he's a skeleton; and it curled its tail round things like a monkey, that I know, for I saw it with my own eyes. That was Professor Rolleston's theory, you know. It was Professor Huxley said it was in his tail–not Mr. Huxley's, of course, but the ape's: only apes have no tails, so I don't quite see that. And then the other gentleman who got up last, Mr. Flower, you know, he said that it was all over the ape, everywhere. All over hippocampuses, from head to foot, poor beast, like a dog all over ticks! I wonder why they don't rub bluestone into the back of its neck, as one does to a pointer. Well, then. Where was I? Oh! and Professor Owen said it wasn't in apes at all: but only in the order bimana, that's you and me. Well, he know best. And they all know best too, for they are monstrous clever fellows. So one must be right, and all the rest wrong, or else one of them wrong, and all the rest right–you see that? I wonder why they don't toss up about it.
Professor Huxley says there's a gulf between a man and an ape. I'm sure I'm glad of it, especially if the ape bit; and Professor Owen says there ain't. What? am I wrong, eh? Of course. Yes–beg a thousand pardons, really now. Of course–Professor Owen says there is, and Professor Huxley says there ain't. Well, a fellow can't recollect everything. But I say, if there's a gulf, the ape might get over it and bite one after all.

— Charles Kingsley, Speech of Lord Dundreary in Section D, on Friday Last, On the Great Hippocampus Question.

The British Medical Journal asked, "Is it not high time that the annual passage of barbed words between Professor Owen and Professor Huxley, on the cerebral distinction between men and monkeys, should cease? ... Continued on its present footing, it becomes a hindrance and an injury to science, a joke for the populace, and a scandal to the scientific world." The London Quarterly Review took up the joke, describing the confrontation of Owen with Huxley and his supporters Rolleston and Flower dramatically: "Animation increased, 'decorous reticence' was at an end, and all parties enjoyed the scene except the disputants. Surely apes were never before so honoured, as to be the theme of the warmest discussion in one of the two principal university towns in England. Strange sight was this, that three or four most accomplished anatomists were contending against each other like so many gorillas, and either reducing man to a monkey, or elevating the monkey to the man!" In October the Medical Times and Gazette reported Owen's presentation with full detail of the responses by Huxley, Rolleston and Flower, as well as Owen's rebuttal. The dispute continued in the next two issues of the magazine.

=== The great hippopotamus test ===
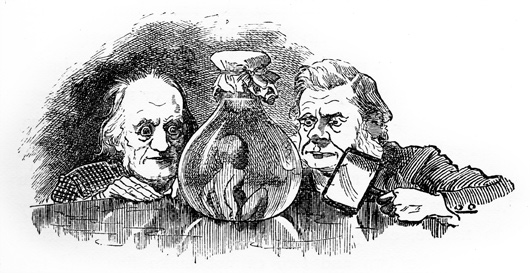
Richard Owen and Thomas Henry Huxley inspect a water baby in a large carboy, in Linley Sambourne's 1885 illustration.

At about the same time as he was attending the Cambridge British Association meeting in 1862, instalments of Charles Kingsley's story for children The Water-Babies, A Fairy Tale for a Land Baby were being published in Macmillan's Magazine as a serial. Kingsley incorporated material modified from his skit about Dundreary's speech On the Great Hippocampus Question, as well as other references to the protagonists, the British Association, and notable scientists of the day. When the protagonist Tom is turned into a water-baby by the fairies, the question is raised that if there were water-babies, surely someone would have caught one and "put it into spirits, or into the Illustrated News, or perhaps cut it into two halves, poor dear little thing, and sent one to Professor Owen, and one to Professor Huxley, to see what they would each say about it." As for the suggestion that a water-baby is contrary to nature;

You must not say that this cannot be, or that that is contrary to nature. You do not know what Nature is, or what she can do; and nobody knows; not even Sir Roderick Murchison, or Professor Owen, or Professor Sedgwick, or Professor Huxley, or Mr. Darwin, or Professor Faraday, or Mr. Grove, or any other of the great men whom good boys are taught to respect. They are very wise men; and you must listen respectfully to all they say: but even if they should say, which I am sure they never would, “That cannot exist. That is contrary to nature,” you must wait a little, and see; for perhaps even they may be wrong.

— Charles Kingsley, The Water Babies.

Keeping up an even-handed treatment, Kingsley introduced as a character in the story Professor Ptthmllnsprts (Put-them-all-in-spirits) as an amalgam of Owen and Huxley, satirising each in turn. Like the very possessive Owen, the Professor was "very good to all the world as long as it was good to him. Only one fault he had, which cock-robins have likewise, as you may see if you look out of the nursery window—that, when any one else found a curious worm, he would hop round them, and peck them, and set up his tail, and bristle up his feathers, just as a cock-robin would; and declare that he found the worm first; and that it was his worm; and, if not, that then it was not a worm at all." Like Huxley, "the professor had not the least notion of allowing that things were true, merely because people thought them beautiful. ... The professor, indeed, went further, and held that no man was forced to believe anything to be true, but what he could see, hear, taste, or handle." A paragraph on "the great hippopotamus test" opens with the Professor, like Huxley, declaring "that apes had hippopotamus majors in their brains just as men have", but then like Owen presenting the argument that "If you have a hippopotamus major in your brain, you are no ape".

He held very strange theories about a good many things. He had even got up once at the British Association, and declared that apes had hippopotamus majors in their brains just as men have. Which was a shocking thing to say; for, if it were so, what would become of the faith, hope, and charity of immortal millions? You may think that there are other more important differences between you and an ape, such as being able to speak, and make machines, and know right from wrong, and say your prayers, and other little matters of that kind; but that is a child’s fancy, my dear. Nothing is to be depended on but the great hippopotamus test. If you have a hippopotamus major in your brain, you are no ape, though you had four hands, no feet, and were more apish than the apes of all aperies. But if a hippopotamus major is ever discovered in one single ape’s brain, nothing will save your great-great-great-great-great-great-great-great-great-great-great-greater-greatest-grandmother from having been an ape too. No, my dear little man; always remember that the one true, certain, final, and all-important difference between you and an ape is, that you have a hippopotamus major in your brain, and it has none; and that, therefore, to discover one in its brain will be a very wrong and dangerous thing, at which every one will be very much shocked, as we may suppose they were at the professor.—Though really, after all, it don’t much matter; because—as Lord Dundreary and others would put it—nobody but men have hippopotamuses in their brains; so, if a hippopotamus was discovered in an ape’s brain, why it would not be one, you know, but something else.

— Charles Kingsley, The Water Babies.

Then, presented with the awkward question, "But why are there not water-babies?", the Professor in Huxley's characteristic voice answered quite sharply: "Because there ain’t."

The Water-Babies was published in book form in 1863, and in the same year an even more satirical short play was published anonymously by George Pycroft. In A Report of a Sad Case Recently Tried before the Lord Mayor, Owen versus Huxley... the Great Bone Case, the vulgarity of the behaviour of Owen and Huxley is parodied as them being taken to court for brawling in the streets and disturbing the peace. In court, they shout terms such as "posterior cornu" and "hippocampus minor". In giving evidence, Huxley states "Well, as I was saying, Owen and me is in the same trade; and we both cuts up monkeys, and I finds something in the brains of them. Hallo! says I, here's a hippocampus. No, there ain't says Owen. Look here says I. I can't see it he says and he sets to werriting and haggling about it, and goes and tells everybody, as what I finds ain't there, and what he finds is".

== Man's Place in Nature ==
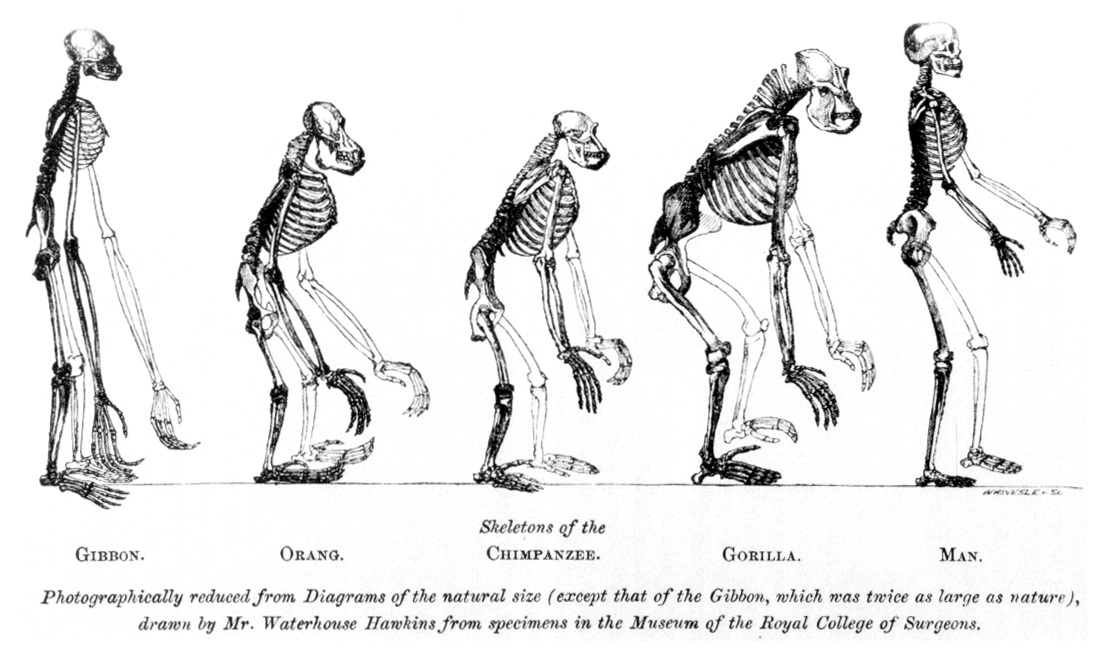
Huxley's book on Man's Place in Nature used illustrations to show that humans and apes had the same basic anatomy.

Huxley expanded his lectures for working men into a book titled Evidence as to Man's Place in Nature, published in 1863. His intention was expressed in a letter to Charles Lyell which referred to the Monkeyana poem of 1861: "I do not think you will find room to complain of any want of distinctness in my definition of Owen's position touching the Hippocampus question. I mean to give the whole history of the business in a note, so that the paraphrase of Sir Ph. Egerton's line 'To which Huxley replies that Owen he lies', shall be unmistakable." Darwin exclaimed, "Hurrah the monkey book has come". A central part of the book provides a step by step explanation suitable for newcomers to anatomy of how the brains of apes and humans are fundamentally similar, with particular reference to both having a posterior lobe, a posterior horn, and a hippocampus minor. The chapter concludes that this close similarity between apes and mankind proves that the original definition by Linnaeus of the biological Order of Primates was correct to include both, and mentions that an explanation of humans originating from apes is provided by Darwin's theory. The book also includes six pages of small print giving "a succinct History of the Controversy respecting the Cerebral Structure of Man and the Apes" describing how Owen had "suppressed" and denied what Huxley had now shown to be the truth regarding the hippocampus minor, posterior horn, and posterior lobe, describing this as reflecting on Owen's "personal veracity". Reviewers regarded the book as a polemic against Owen, and a majority of them sided with Huxley.

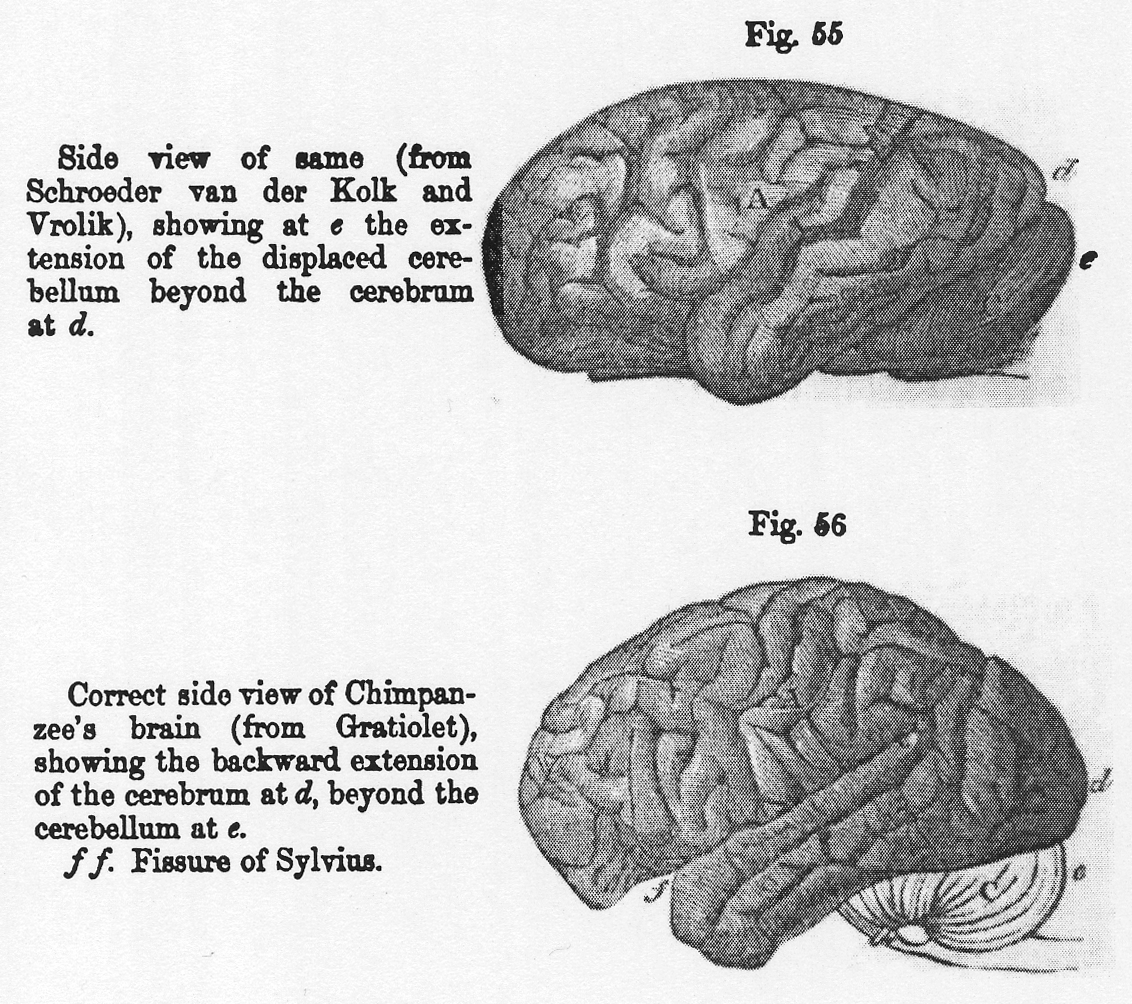
Lyell's book included an illustration showing the distorted image of a chimpanzee brain used by Owen, and a correct view by another anatomist showing the projection of the occipital lobe at the rear which Owen said was not present in apes.

Sir Charles Lyell's authoritative Geological Evidences of the Antiquity of Man was also published in 1863, and included a detailed review of the hippocampus question which gave solid and unambiguous support to Huxley's arguments. In an attempt to refute Lyell's judgement, Owen again defended his classification scheme, introducing a new claim that the hippocampus minor was virtually absent in an "idiot". Then in 1866 Owen's book On the Anatomy of Vertebrates presented accurate brain illustrations. In a long footnote, Owen cited himself and the earlier literature to admit at last that in apes "all the homologous parts of the human cerebral organ exist". However, he still believed that this did not invalidate his classification of man in a separate subclass. He now claimed that the structures concerned – the posterior lobe, the posterior horn, and the hippocampus minor – were in apes only "under modified form and low grades of development". He accused Huxley and his allies of making "puerile", "ridiculous" and "disgraceful" attacks on his scheme of classification.

The publicity surrounding the affair tarnished Owen's reputation. While Owen had a laudable aim of finding an objective way of defining the uniqueness of humanity and distinguishing their brain anatomy in a qualitative way, not just a quantitative way, his obstinacy in refusing to admit his errors in trying to find that difference led to his fall from the pinnacle of British science. Huxley gained influence, and his X Club of like minded scientists used the journal Nature to promote evolution and naturalism, shaping much of late Victorian science. Even many of his supporters, including Charles Lyell and Alfred Russel Wallace, thought that though humans shared a common ancestor with apes, the higher mental faculties could not have evolved through a purely material process. Darwin published his own explanation in 1871 in the Descent of Man.

== Modern relevance ==
In a talk about biological systematics (classification) and cladistics given at the American Museum of Natural History in 1981, the paleontologist Colin Patterson discussed an argument put in a paper by Ernst Mayr that humans could be distinguished from apes by the presence of Broca's area in the brain. Patterson commented that this reminded him of "The Great Hippocampus Question" as recorded in fiction by Kingsley, and as in fact being a controversy between Huxley and Owen that "eventually as usual, Huxley won."
