= Lord Dundreary =

Character in the play Our American Cousin

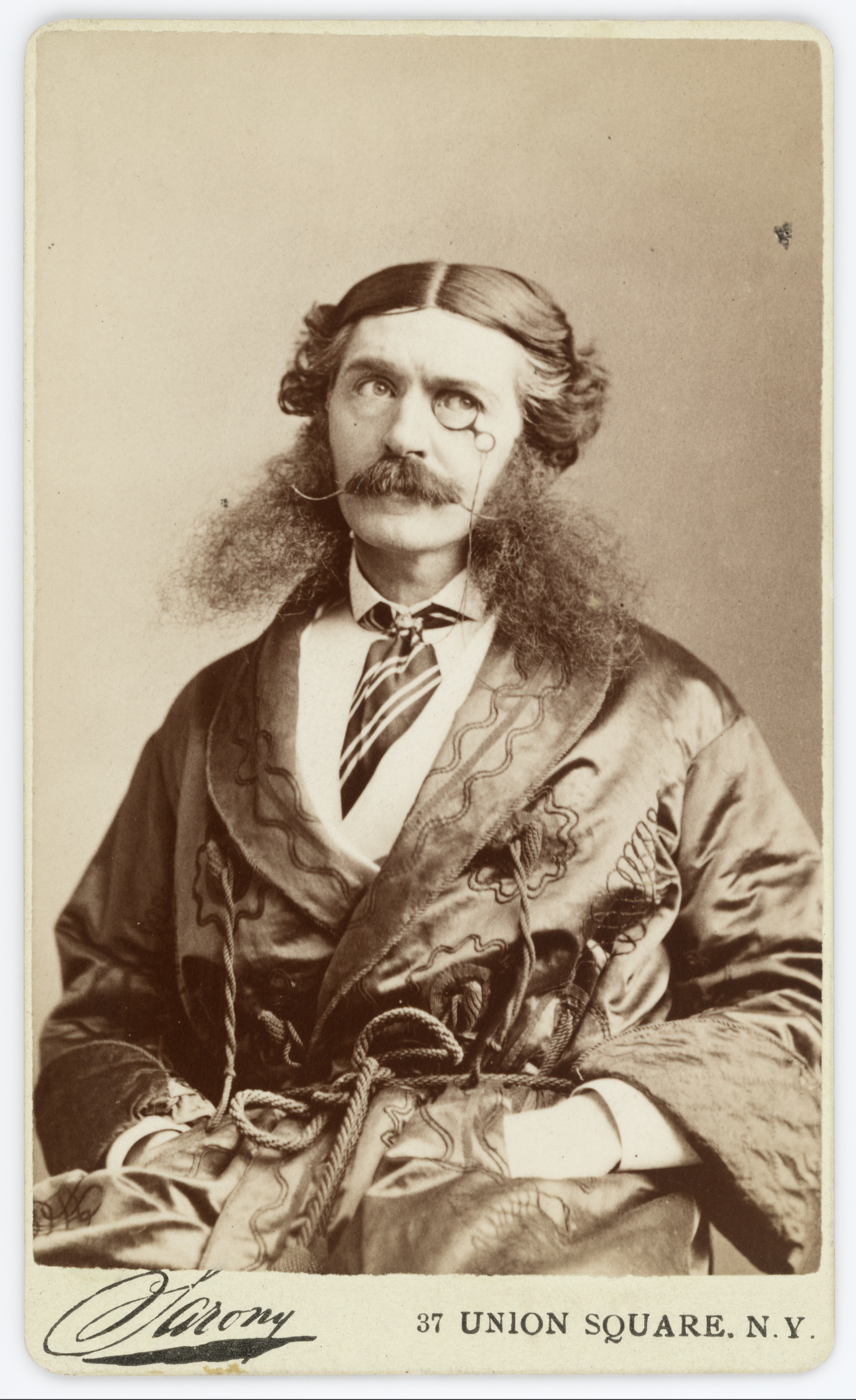
Edward Sothern as Lord Dundreary, sporting "Dundrearies" - cabinet card photograph from the studio of Napoleon Sarony

Lord Dundreary is a character of the 1858 English play Our American Cousin by Tom Taylor. He is a good-natured, brainless aristocrat. The role was created on stage by Edward Askew Sothern. The most famous scene involved Dundreary reading a letter from his even sillier brother. Sothern expanded the scene considerably in performance. A number of spin-off works were also created, including a play about the brother.

== Impact ==
His name gave rise to two eponyms rarely heard today – "Dundrearies" and "Dundrearyisms". The former referred to a particular style of facial hair taking the form of exaggeratedly bushy sideburns, also called "dundreary whiskers" (or "Piccadilly weepers" in England) which were popular between 1840 and 1870. The latter eponym was used to refer to expanded malapropisms in the form of twisted and nonsensical aphorisms in the style of Lord Dundreary (e.g., "birds of a feather gather no moss").

== Depiction by Charles Kingsley ==
Charles Kingsley wrote an essay entitled, "Speech of Lord Dundreary in Section D, on Friday Last, On the Great Hippocampus Question", a parody of debates about human and ape anatomical features (and their implications for evolutionary theory) in the form of a nonsensical speech supposed to have been written by Dundreary.
