= Richard Owen =

English biologist and palaeontologist (1804–1892)

Sir Richard Owen KCB FRS FRMS
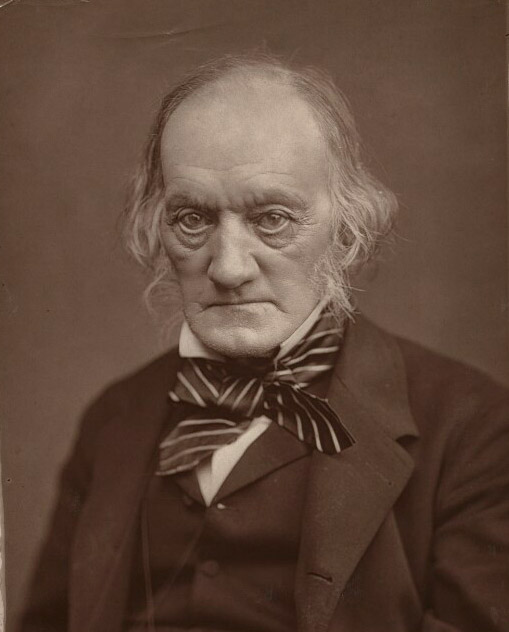
- Portrait of Owen, c. 1878
- Born: 20 July 1804; Lancaster, England
- Died: 18 December 1892 (aged 88); Richmond Park, London, England
- Education: University of Edinburgh
- Known for: Coining the term dinosaur, presenting them as a distinct taxonomic group British Museum of Natural History
- Awards: Wollaston Medal (1838); Royal Medal (1846); Copley Medal (1851); Baly Medal (1869); Clarke Medal (1878); Linnean Medal (1888)
- Scientific career
- Fields: Comparative anatomy Paleontology; Zoology; Biology
- Workplaces: St Bartholomew's Hospital
- Author abbrev. (zoology): Owen

Sir Richard Owen KCB FRS FRMS (20 July 1804 – 18 December 1892) was an English biologist, comparative anatomist and palaeontologist. Owen is generally considered to have been an outstanding naturalist with a remarkable gift for interpreting fossils.

Owen produced a vast array of scientific work, but is probably best remembered today for coining the word Dinosauria (meaning "Terrible Reptile" or "Fearfully Great Reptile"). An outspoken critic of Charles Darwin's theory of evolution by natural selection, Owen agreed with Darwin that evolution occurred but thought it was more complex than outlined in Darwin's On the Origin of Species. Owen's approach to evolution can be considered to have anticipated the issues that have gained greater attention with the recent emergence of evolutionary developmental biology.

Owen was the first president of the Microscopical Society of London in 1839 and edited many issues of its journal – then known as The Microscopic Journal. Owen also campaigned for the natural specimens in the British Museum to be given a new home. This resulted in the establishment, in 1881, of the now world-famous Natural History Museum in South Kensington, London. Bill Bryson argues that, "by making the Natural History Museum an institution for everyone, Owen transformed our expectations of what museums are for."

While he made several contributions to science and public learning, Owen was a controversial figure among his contemporaries, both for his disagreements on matters of common descent and for accusations that he took credit for other people's work.

== Biography ==
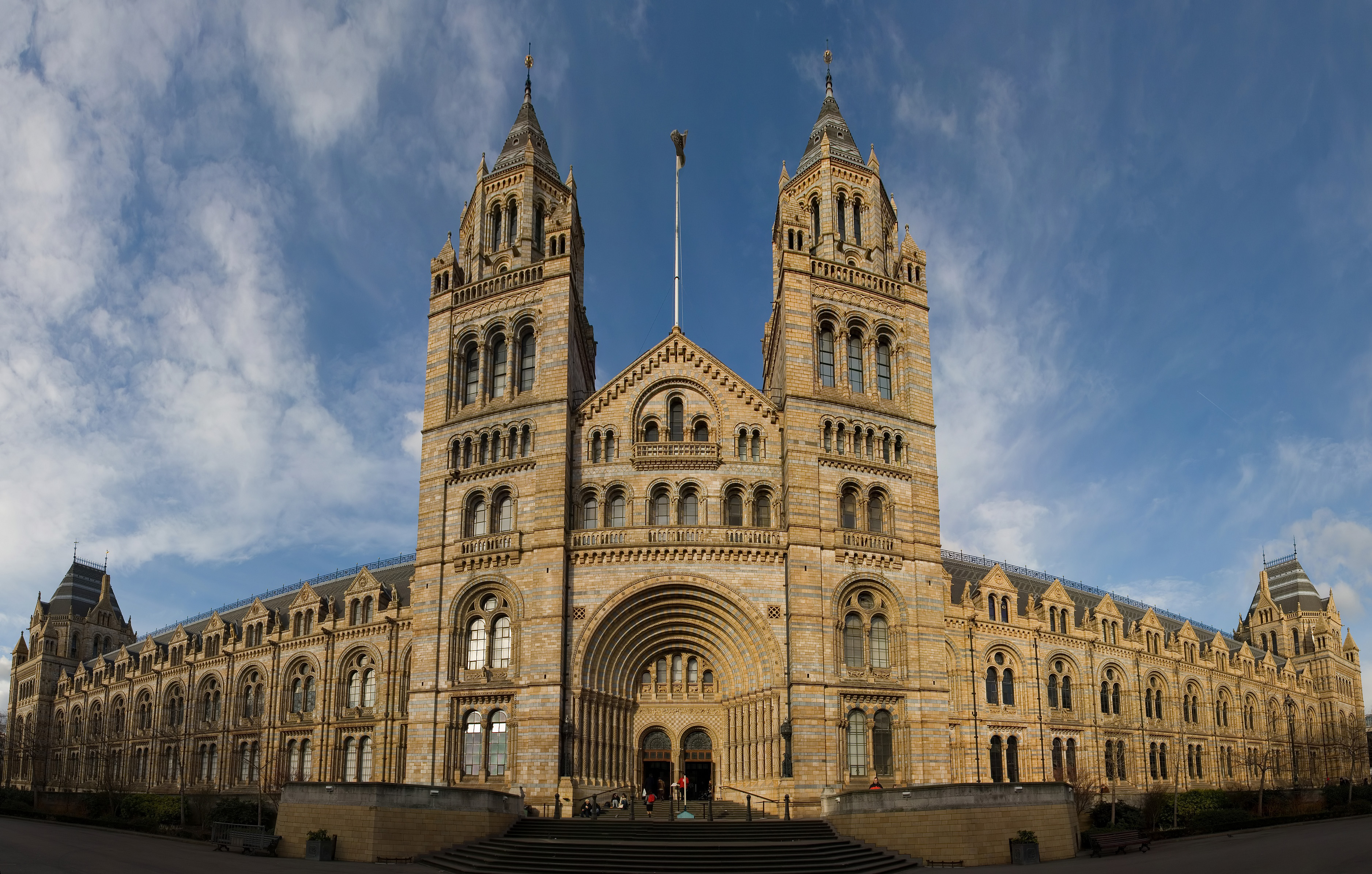
Owen was the driving force behind the establishment, in 1881, of the British Museum (Natural History) in London.

Owen became a surgeon's apprentice in 1820 and was appointed to the Royal College of Surgeons in 1826. In 1836, Owen was appointed Hunterian professor at the Royal College, and in 1849, he succeeded William Clift as conservator of the Hunterian Museum. He held the latter office until 1856 when he became superintendent of the natural history department of the British Museum. He then devoted much of his energies to a great scheme for a National Museum of Natural History, which eventually resulted in the removal of the natural history collections of the British Museum to a new building at South Kensington: the British Museum (Natural History) (now the Natural History Museum). He retained office until the completion of this work, in December 1883, when he was made a knight of the Order of the Bath.

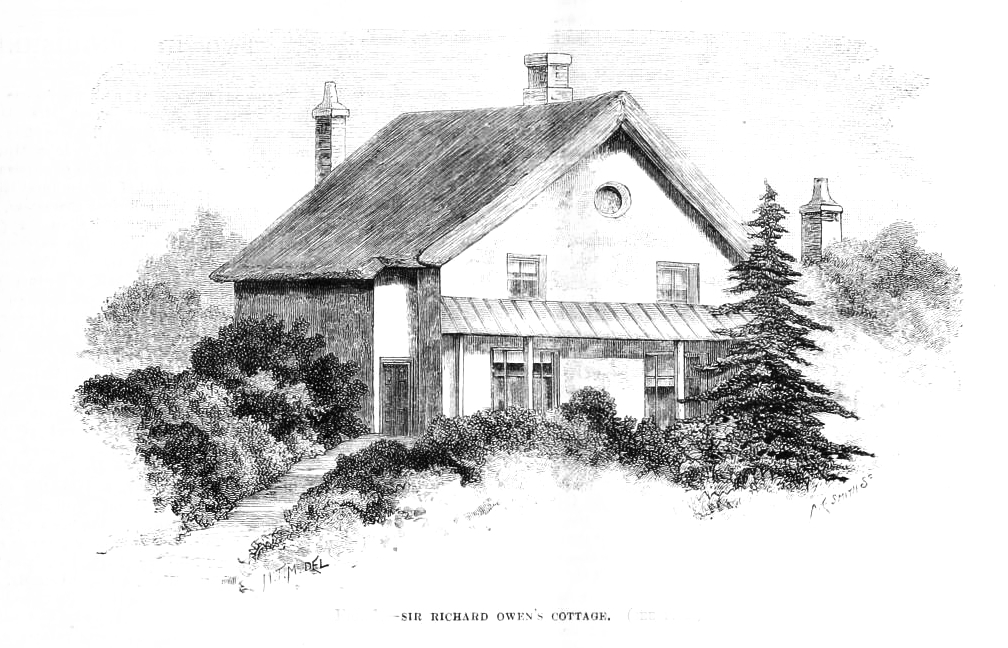
Sheen Lodge, Richmond Park, home of Owen

Owen always tended to support orthodox men of science and the status quo. The royal family presented him with the cottage in Richmond Park and Robert Peel put him on the Civil List. In 1843, he was elected a foreign member of the Royal Swedish Academy of Sciences. In 1844 he became an associated member of the Royal Institute of the Netherlands. When this Institute became the Royal Netherlands Academy of Arts and Sciences in 1851, he joined as a foreign member. In 1845, he was elected as a member to the American Philosophical Society.

He died at home on 15 December 1892 and is buried in the churchyard at St Andrew's Church, Ham, near Richmond, Surrey.

== Work on invertebrates ==
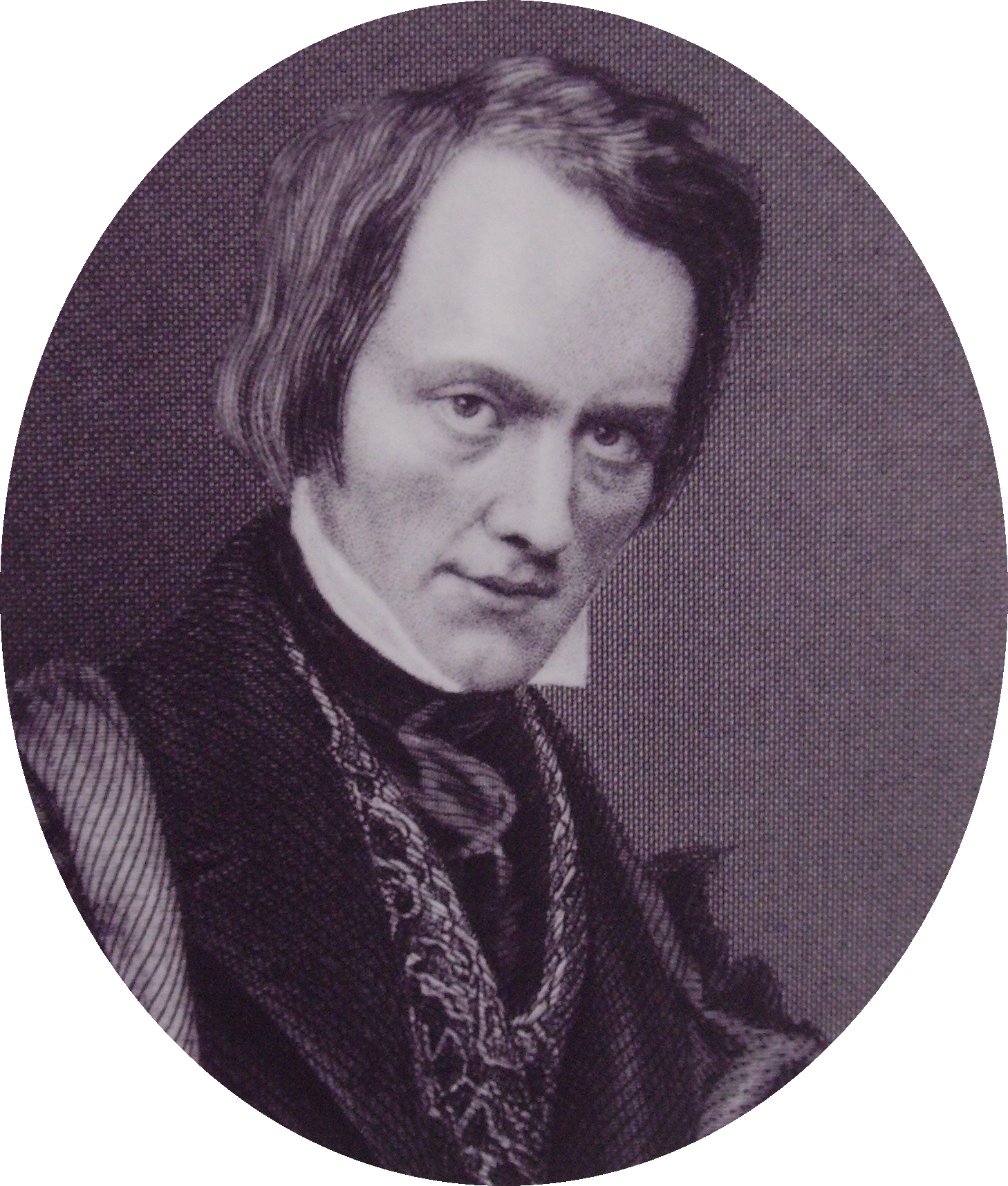
The young Richard Owen

While occupied with the cataloguing of the Hunterian collection, Owen did not confine his attention to the preparations before him but also seized every opportunity to dissect fresh subjects. He was allowed to examine all animals that died in London Zoo's gardens and, when the Zoo began to publish scientific proceedings, in 1831, he was the most prolific contributor of anatomical papers. His first notable publication, however, was his Memoir on the Pearly Nautilus (London, 1832), which was soon recognized as a classic. Thenceforth, he continued to make important contributions to every department of comparative anatomy and zoology for a period of over fifty years. In the sponges, Owen was the first to describe the now well-known Venus' Flower Basket or Euplectella (1841, 1857). Among Entozoa, his most noteworthy discovery was that of Trichina spiralis (1835), the parasite infesting the muscles of man in the disease now termed trichinosis (see also, however, Sir James Paget). Of Brachiopoda he made very special studies, which much advanced knowledge and settled the classification that has long been accepted. Among Mollusca, he described not only the pearly nautilus but also Spirula (1850) and other Cephalopoda, both living and extinct, and it was he who proposed the universally-accepted subdivision of this class into the two orders of Dibranchiata and Tetrabranchiata (1832). In 1852 Owen named Protichnites – the oldest footprints found on land. Applying his knowledge of anatomy, he correctly postulated that these Cambrian trackways were made by an extinct type of arthropod, and he did this more than 150 years before any fossils of the animal were found. Owen envisioned a resemblance of the animal to the living arthropod Limulus.

== Fish, reptiles, birds, and naming of dinosaurs ==
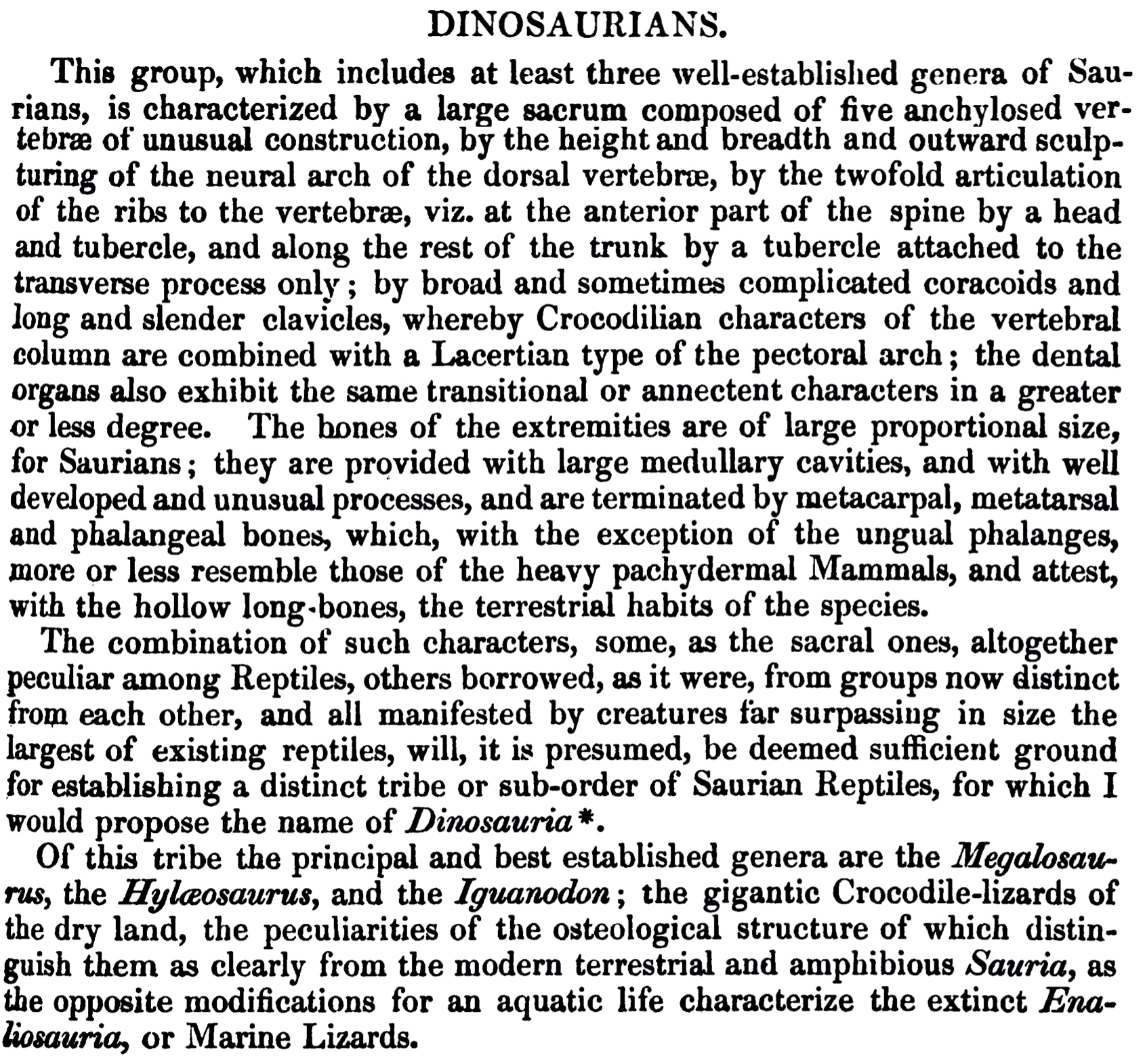
Owen's coining of the word dinosaur in 1841

Most of his work on reptiles related to the skeletons of extinct forms and his chief memoirs, on British specimens, were reprinted in a connected series in his History of British Fossil Reptiles (4 vols. London 1849–1884). He published the first important general account of the great group of Mesozoic land-reptiles, and he coined the name Dinosauria from Greek δεινός (deinos) "terrible, powerful, wondrous" + σαύρος (sauros) "lizard". Owen used 3 genera to define the dinosaurs: the carnivorous Megalosaurus, the herbivorous Iguanodon and armoured Hylaeosaurus, specimens uncovered in southern England.

With Benjamin Waterhouse Hawkins, Owen helped create the first life-sized models of dinosaurs as he thought they might have appeared. Some models were initially created for the Great Exhibition of 1851 held in London's Hyde Park, but 33 were eventually produced when the Crystal Palace was relocated to Crystal Palace Park, in south London. Owen famously hosted a dinner for 21 prominent men of science inside the hollow concrete Iguanodon on New Year's Eve 1853. However, in 1849, a few years before his death in 1852, Gideon Mantell had realised that Iguanodon, of which he was the discoverer, was not a heavy, pachyderm-like animal, as Owen was proposing, but had slender forelimbs.

== Work on mammals ==
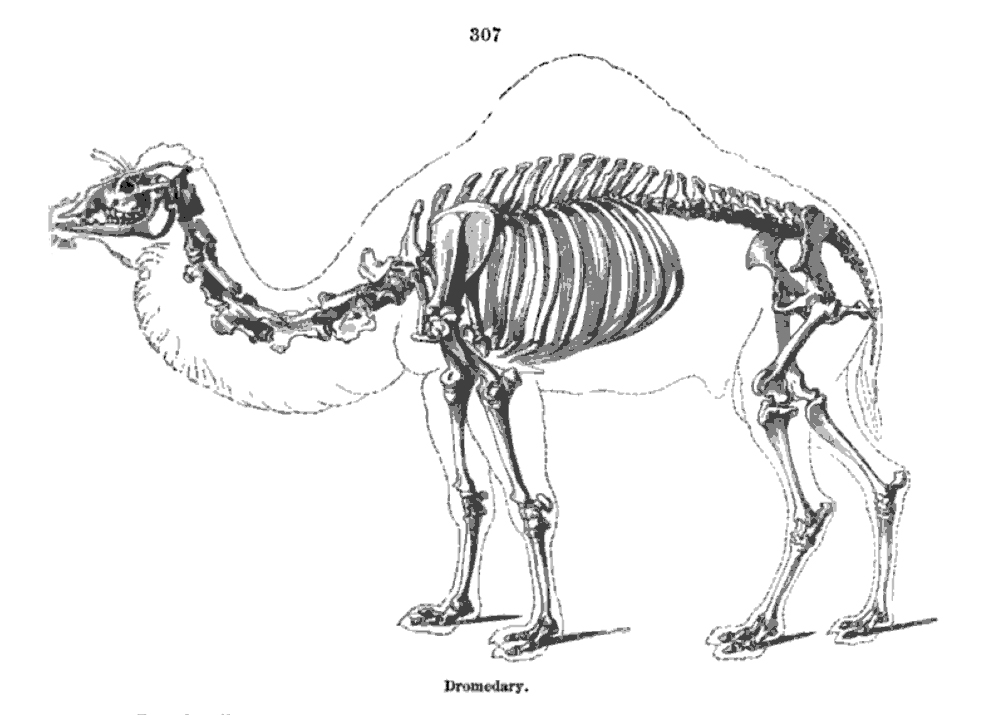
Owen's illustration of a camel's skeleton

Owen was granted right of first refusal on any freshly dead animal at the London Zoo. His wife once arrived home to find the carcass of a newly deceased rhinoceros in her front hallway.

At the same time, Sir Thomas Mitchell's discovery of fossil bones, in New South Wales, provided material for the first of Owen's long series of papers on the extinct mammals of Australia, which were eventually reprinted in book-form in 1877. He described Diprotodon (1838) and Thylacoleo (1859), and extinct species kangaroos and wombats of gigantic size. Most fossil material found in Australia and New Zealand was initially sent to England for expert examination, and with the assistance of the local collectors Owen became the first authority on the palaeontology of the region. While occupied with so much material from abroad, Owen was also busily collecting facts for an exhaustive work on similar fossils from the British Isles and, in 1844–1846, he published his History of British Fossil Mammals and Birds, which was followed by many later memoirs, notably his Monograph of the Fossil Mammalia of the Mesozoic Formations (Palaeont. Soc., 1871). One of his latest publications was a little work entitled Antiquity of Man as deduced from the Discovery of a Human Skeleton during Excavations of the Docks at Tilbury (London, 1884).

== Owen, Darwin, and the theory of evolution ==
Sometime during the 1840s Owen came to the conclusion that species arise as the result of some sort of evolutionary process. He believed that there were a total of six possible mechanisms: Parthenogenesis, prolonged development, premature birth, congenital malformations, Lamarckian atrophy, Lamarckian hypertrophy and transmutation, of which he thought transmutation was the least likely.

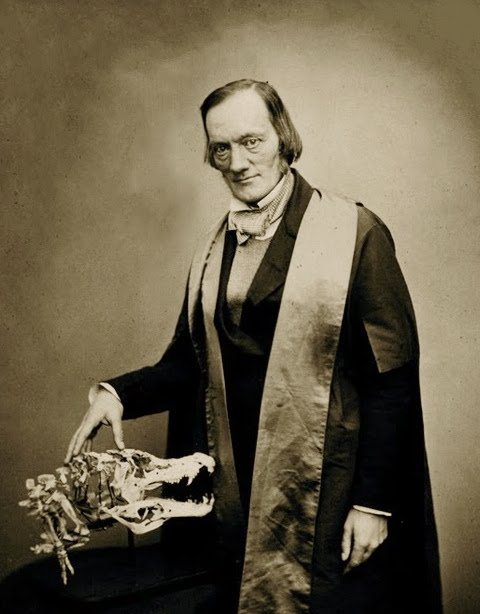
Owen in 1856 with the skull of a crocodile

Science historian Evelleen Richards has argued that Owen was likely sympathetic to developmental theories of evolution, but backed away from publicly proclaiming them after the critical reaction that had greeted the anonymously published evolutionary book Vestiges of the Natural History of Creation in 1844 (it was revealed only decades later that the book had been authored by publisher Robert Chambers). Owen had been criticised for his own evolutionary remarks in his On the Nature of Limbs in 1849. At the end of On the Nature of Limbs, Owen suggested that humans ultimately evolved from fish as the result of natural laws, which resulted in Owen being criticized in the Manchester Spectator for denying that species such as humans were created by God.

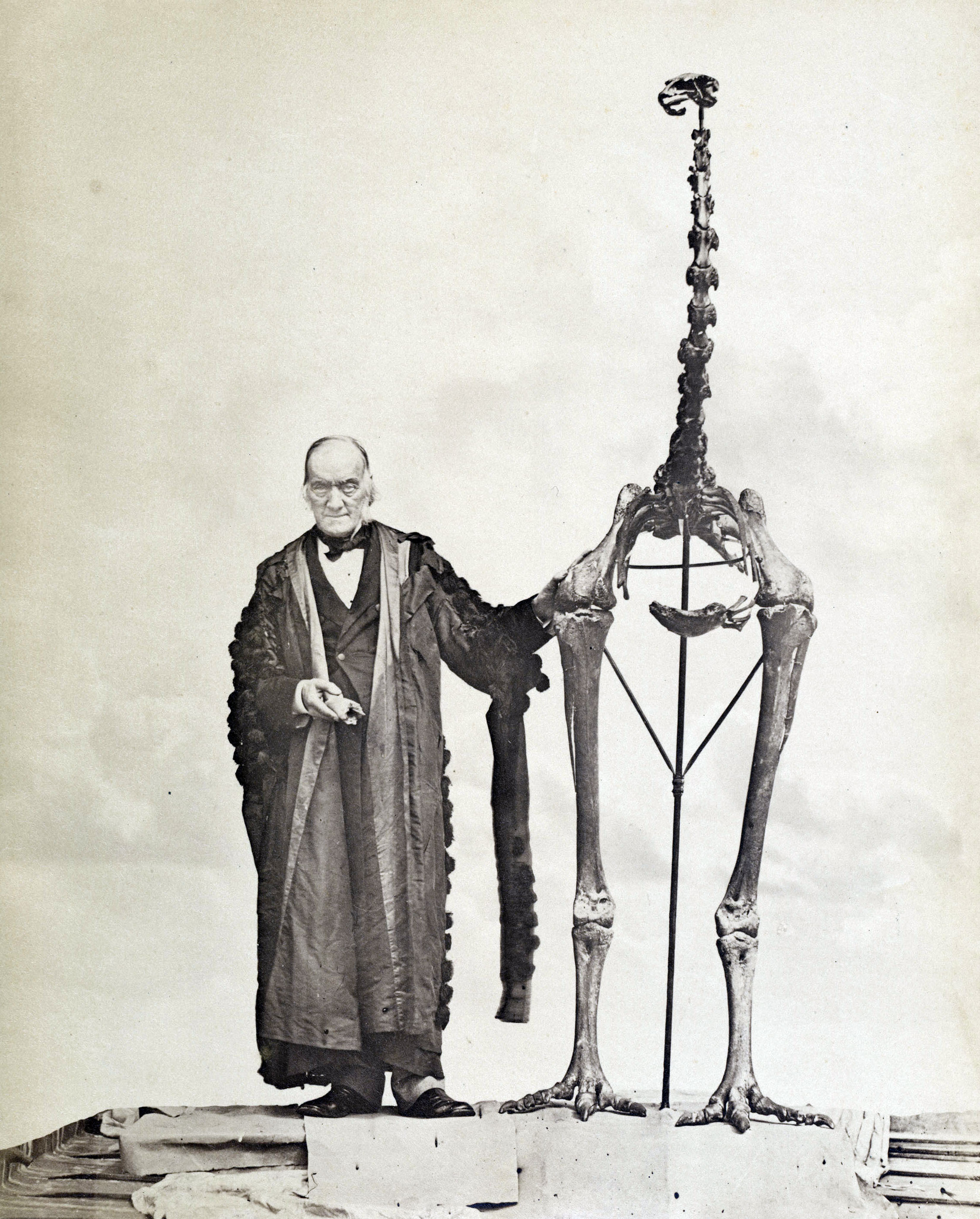
Owen with a giant moa skeleton in 1879

Owen, as president-elect of the British Association, announced his authoritative anatomical studies of primate brains, stating that the human brain had structures that ape brains did not and that therefore humans were a separate sub-class, starting a dispute which was subsequently satirised as the Great Hippocampus Question. Owen's main argument was that humans have much larger brains for their body size than other mammals including the great apes.

In 1862 (and later occasions) Thomas Huxley took the opportunity to arrange demonstrations of ape brain anatomy (e.g. at the BA meeting, where William Flower performed the dissection). Visual evidence of the supposedly missing structures (posterior cornu and hippocampus minor) was used, in effect, to indict Owen for perjury: Owen had argued that the absence of those structures in apes was connected with the lesser size to which the ape brains grew, but he then conceded that a poorly developed version might be construed as present without preventing him from arguing that brain size was still the major way of distinguishing apes and humans.

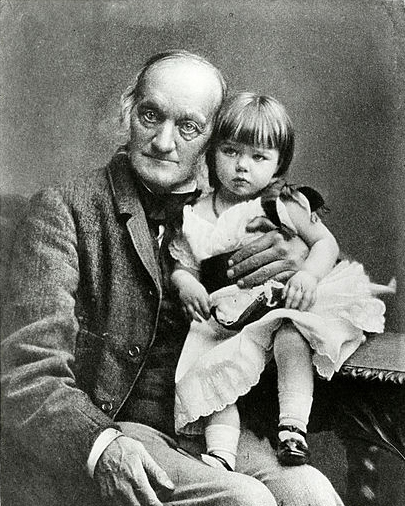
Owen c.1890s with his granddaughter Emily

Huxley's campaign ran over two years and was devastatingly successful at persuading the overall scientific community, with each "slaying" being followed by a recruiting drive for the Darwinian cause. The spite lingered. While Owen had argued that humans were distinct from apes by virtue of having large brains, Huxley said that racial diversity blurred any such distinction. In his paper criticising Owen, Huxley directly states:

... "if we place A, the European brain, B, the Bosjesman brain, and C, the orang brain, in a series, the differences between A and B, so far as they have been ascertained, are of the same nature as the chief of those between B and C".

Owen countered Huxley by saying the brains of all human races were really of similar size and intellectual ability, and that the fact that humans had brains that were twice the size of large apes like male gorillas, even though humans had much smaller bodies, made humans distinguishable.

== Legacy ==
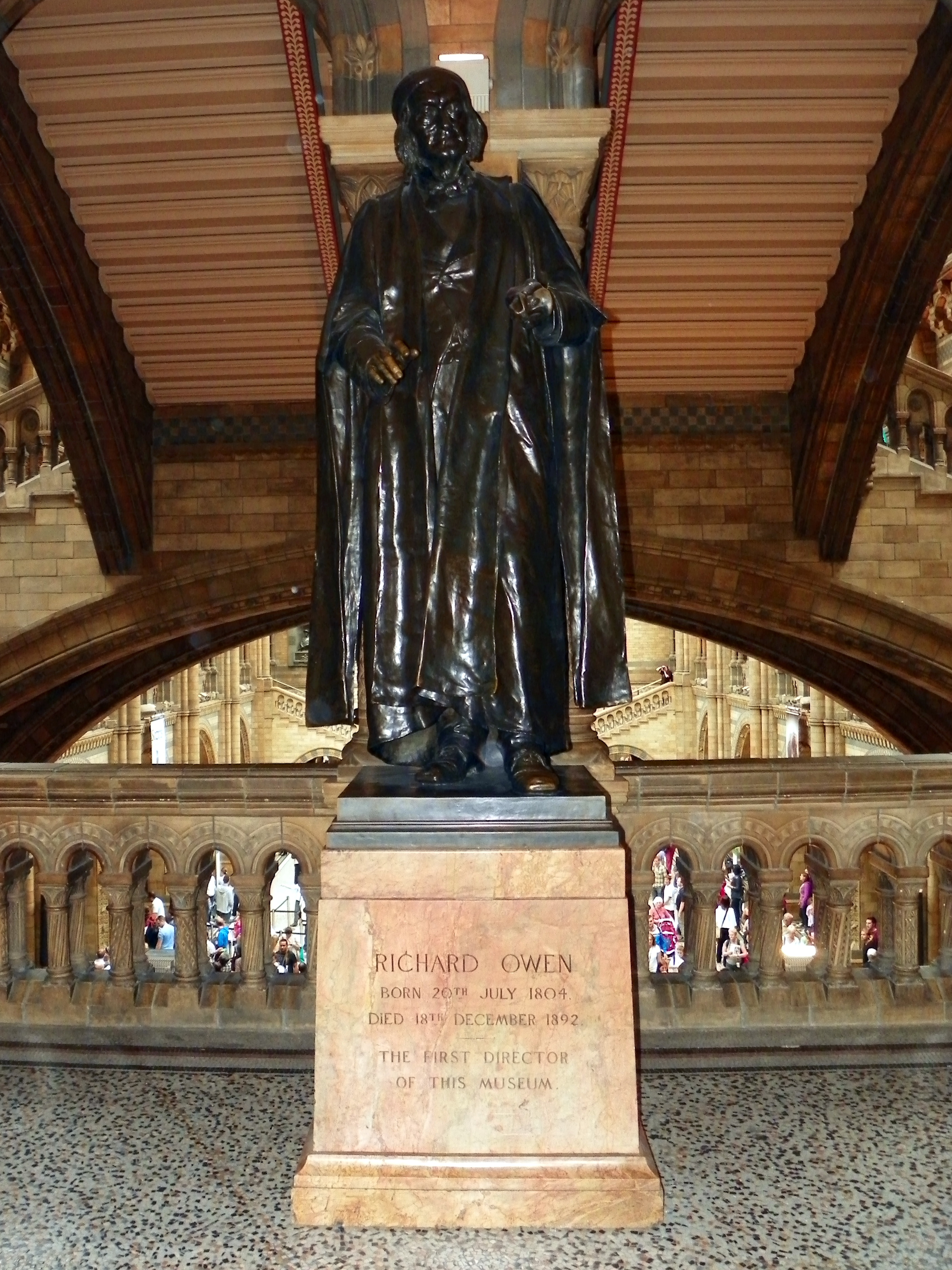
Supplanted statue of Owen in the Natural History Museum, London.

He was the first director in Natural History Museum in London and his statue was in the main hall there until 2009, when it was replaced with a statue of Darwin. A bust of Owen by Alfred Gilbert (1896) is held in the Hunterian Museum, London.

A species of Central American lizard, Siderolamprus owenii, was named in his honour by French herpetologists André Marie Constant Duméril and Gabriel Bibron in 1839. In 2025, a fossil snake from Hordle Cliff was named Paradoxophidion richardoweni in recognition of Owen's pioneering work on fossil snakes from the area and his role in establishing the Natural History Museum, where the specimen had been stored since 1981.

The Sir Richard Owen Wetherspoons pub in central Lancaster is named in his honour.

== Conflicts with his peers ==
Owen has been described by some as a malicious, dishonest and hateful individual. He has been described in one biography as being a "social experimenter with a penchant for sadism. Addicted to controversy and driven by arrogance and jealousy". Deborah Cadbury stated that Owen possessed an "almost fanatical egoism with a callous delight in savaging his critics." An Oxford University professor once described Owen as "a damned liar. He lied for God and for malice". Gideon Mantell said it was "a pity a man so talented should be so dastardly and envious". Richard Broke Freeman described him as "the most distinguished vertebrate zoologist and palaeontologist ... but a most deceitful and odious man". Charles Darwin stated that "No one fact tells so strongly against Owen ... as that he has never reared one pupil or follower."

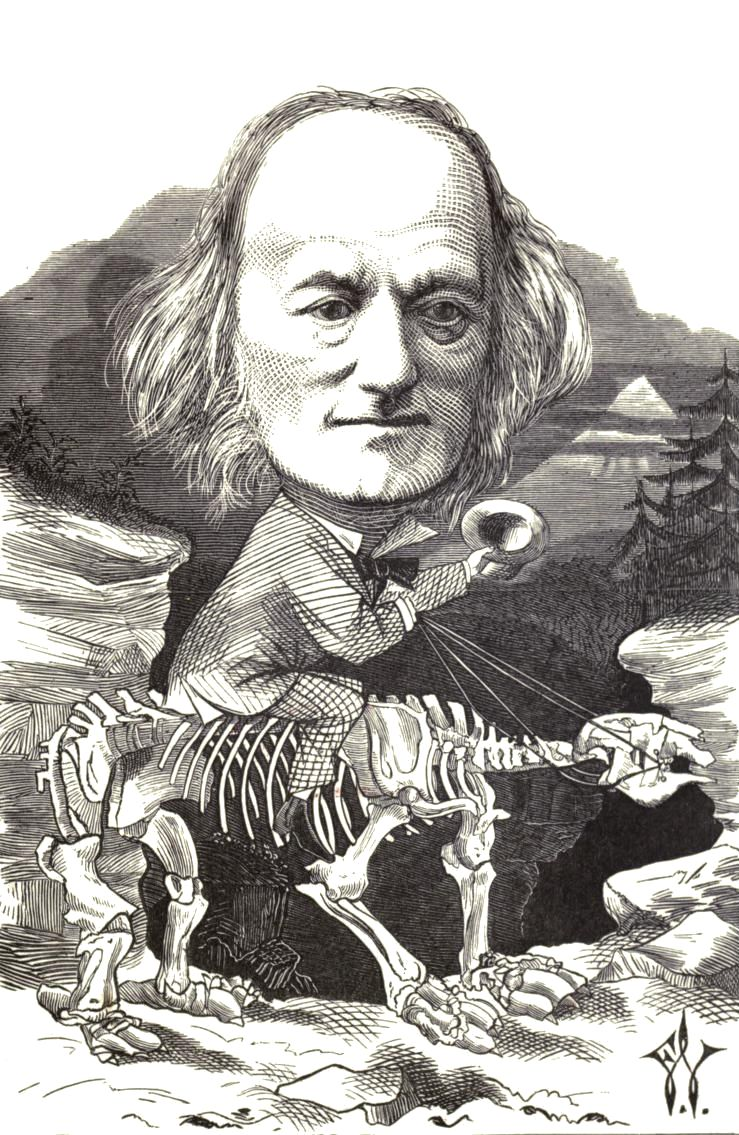
Caricature of Owen "riding his hobby" (Megatherium), by Frederick Waddy (1873).

Owen famously credited himself and Georges Cuvier with the discovery of the Iguanodon, completely excluding any credit for the original discoverer of the dinosaur, Gideon Mantell. This was not the first or last time Owen would falsely claim a discovery as his own. It has also been suggested by some authors that Owen even used his influence in the Royal Society to ensure that many of Mantell's research papers were never published. Owen was finally dismissed from the Royal Society's Zoological Council for plagiarism.

Another reason for his criticism of the Origin, some historians claim, was that Owen felt upstaged by Darwin and supporters such as Huxley, and his judgment was clouded by jealousy. In Darwin's opinion, Owen was "spiteful, extremely malignant, clever; the Londoners say he is mad with envy because my book is so talked about".

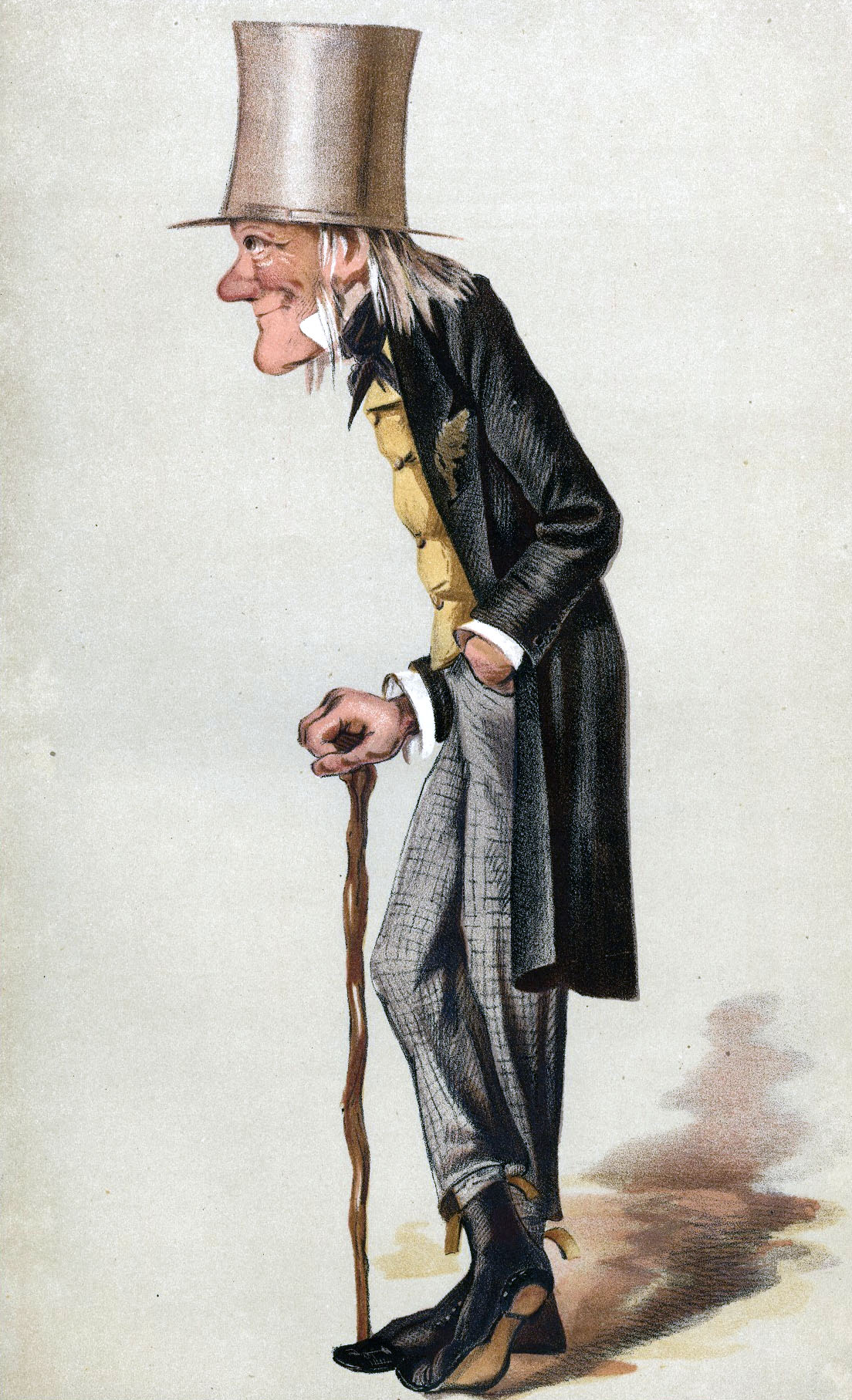
Caricature of an elderly Owen, captioned with the pun "Old Bones", in the London magazine Vanity Fair, March 1873

Owen also resorted to the same subterfuge he used against Mantell, writing another anonymous article in the Edinburgh Review in April 1860. In the article, Owen was critical of Darwin for not offering many new observations, and heaped praise (in the third person) upon himself, while being careful not to associate any particular comment with his own name. Owen did praise, however, the Origin's description of Darwin's work on insect behaviour and pigeon breeding as "real gems".

Owen was also a party to the threat to end government funding of the Royal Botanic Gardens, Kew botanical collection (see Attacks on Hooker and Kew), orchestrated by Acton Smee Ayrton:

"There is no doubt that rivalry resulted between the British Museum, where there was the very important Herbarium of the Department of Botany, and Kew. The rivalry at times became extremely personal, especially between Hooker and Owen ... At the root was Owen's feeling that Kew should be subordinate to the British Museum (and to Owen) and should not be allowed to develop as an independent scientific institution with the advantage of a great botanic garden."

Owen's lost scientific standing was not due solely to his underhanded dealings with colleagues; it was also due to serious errors of scientific judgement that were discovered and publicised. A fine example was his decision to classify man in a separate subclass of the Mammalia (see Man's place in nature). In this, Owen had no supporters at all. Also, his unwillingness to come off the fence concerning evolution became increasingly damaging to his reputation as time went on. Owen continued working after his official retirement at the age of 79, but he never recovered the good opinions he had garnered in his younger days.

== Bibliography ==
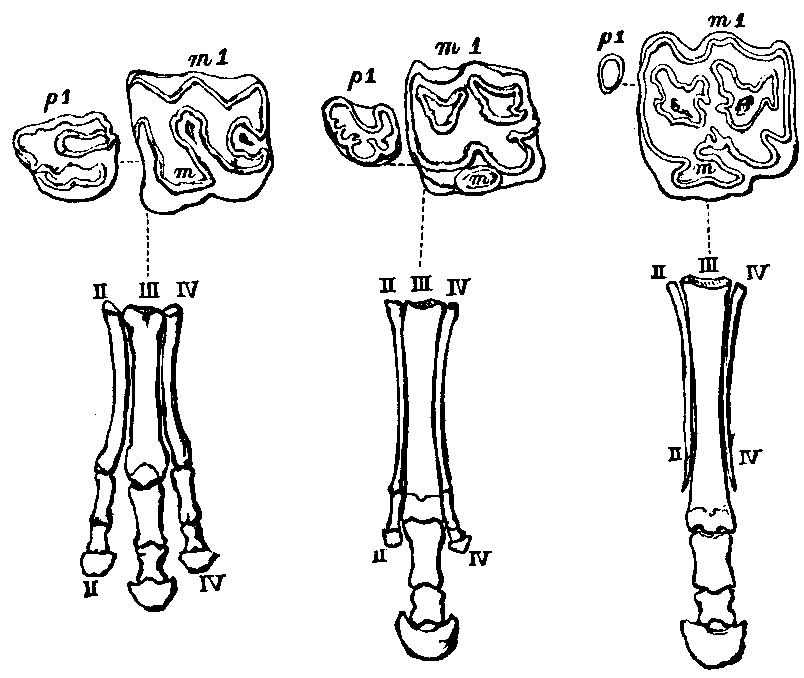
Page from On the Anatomy of Vertebrates

- Memoir on the Pearly Nautilus (1832)
- Odontography (1840–1845)
- Description of the Skeleton of an Extinct Gigantic Sloth (1842)
- On the Archetype and Homologies of the Vertebrate Skeleton (1848)
- History of British Fossil Reptiles (4 vols., 1849–1884)
- On the Nature of Limbs (1849)
- Palæontology or a Systematic Summary of Extinct Animals and Their Geological Relations (1860)
- Archaeopteryx (1863)
- Anatomy of Vertebrates (1866)
  - Available at Google Books:
  - Volume I, Fishes and Reptiles
  - Volume II, Birds and Mammals
  - Volume III, Mammals
- Memoir of the Dodo (1866)
- Monograph of the Fossil Mammalia of the Mesozoic Formations (1871)
- Catalogue of the Fossil Reptilia of South Africa (1876)

Academic offices
Preceded by Thomas Henry Huxley	Fullerian Professor of Physiology; 1858–1862	Succeeded by John Marshall
Awards and achievements
Preceded by New award	Clarke Medal; 1878	Succeeded by George Bentham
