= Frederick Waddy =

English artist

Frederick Waddy (1848–1901) was a British caricaturist and cartoonist.

Waddy provided cartoon caricatures of many of the leading men of his day for the weekly literary magazine Once a Week. The 1873 publication Cartoon Portraits and Biographical Sketches of Men of the Day included illustrations from drawings by Waddy accompanying anonymous essays on fifty notable subjects, including Darwin, Swinburne, Tennyson, and Browning.

== Bibliography ==
- Savory, Jerold; Marks, Patricia (1985). The Smiling Muse: Victoriana in the Comic Press. London and Toronto: Associated University Presses.
- "Cartoon Portraits of Men of the Day (1873)", The Public Domain Review. Accessed 2 March 2022.
