= Geological Evidences of the Antiquity of Man =

Book by Charles Lyell

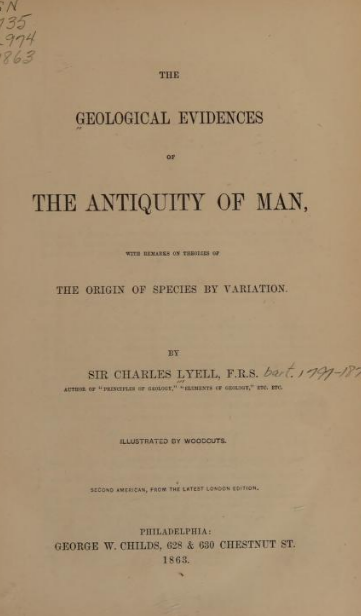
- Title page for Geological Evidences of the Antiquity of Man (1863)
- Author: Charles Lyell
- Language: English
- Genre: Non-fiction
- Publication date: 1863
- Publication place: United Kingdom
- Media type: Print (Hardcover & Paperback) & E-book
- Pages: c.300 pp (May change depending on the publisher and the size of the text)
- Text: Geological Evidences of the Antiquity of Man at Wikisource

Geological Evidences of the Antiquity of Man is a book written by British geologist, Charles Lyell in 1863. The first three editions appeared in February, April, and November 1863, respectively. A much-revised fourth edition appeared in 1873. Antiquity of Man, as it was known to contemporary readers, dealt with three scientific issues that had become prominent in the preceding decade: the age of the human race, the existence of ice ages, and Charles Darwin's theory of evolution by natural selection. Lyell used the book to reverse or modify his own long-held positions on all three issues. The book drew sharp criticism from two of Lyell's younger colleagues – paleontologist Hugh Falconer and archaeologist John Lubbock – who felt that Lyell had used their work too freely and acknowledged it too sparingly. It sold well, however, and (along with Lubbock's 1865 book Prehistoric Times) helped to establish the new science of prehistoric archaeology in Great Britain.

== Background ==
Lyell had been consistently skeptical of evidence for high human antiquity since the early 1830s, and distanced himself from the theory of ice ages after a brief flirtation with it in the early 1840s. He attacked the evolutionary ideas of Lamarck in detail in his book Principles of Geology. New developments in all three areas forced him to reconsider these positions in the late 1850s and early 1860s, and became the subject matter for Antiquity of Man.

== Content ==
The section about man summed up the evidence for human antiquity that had been brought to light by British geologists in 1858-59, and integrated it with archaeological evidence from the Paleolithic, Neolithic, and Bronze Age.

The section about glaciation integrated continental ice ages into the larger picture of the Quaternary Period that Lyell had built up in his earlier works.

The section about evolution recapitulated Darwin's arguments and endorsed them, though not enthusiastically. It acknowledged that human bodies might have evolved, but left open the possibility of divine intervention in the origins of human intellect and moral sense.

== Controversy ==
Hugh Falconer, a key player in the establishment of human antiquity, charged that Lyell – a minor player in the process – had misleadingly cast himself in the lead while ignoring the contributions of others. He raised his charges in the pages of the weekly journal The Athenaeum, and pressed them with a vehemence that some of his colleagues found distasteful.

John Lubbock, a young but rising scientific star and a member of Darwin's inner circle, charged that Lyell had incorporated large amounts of material that Lubbock had published in articles and was then reworked into a book of his own. His criticism was largely private, but well known in the scientific circles in which both moved.

Lyell gradually changed the text of Antiquity of Man to blunt some of their criticisms, but throughout the process held that he had been wrongly accused. Lyell's response is recorded in his archive, held at the University of Edinburgh's Heritage Collections, who have also created a dedicated website to Lyell's work.

== Impact ==
Antiquity of Man had its greatest impact in the years immediately after its publication. Lyell's presentation and endorsement of the new evidence for human antiquity firmly established the theory as scientific orthodoxy. His integration of both ice ages and a very old human race into the (geologically) recent history of the Earth was novel for its time, as was his presentation of archaeological data that from continental Europe. Until the early 1860s, "archaeology" had been synonymous, in England, with the study of antiquity and the Middle Ages through artifacts. Antiquity of Man expanded it to include the study of prehistory.

The book's three-part structure meant, however, that it was quickly supplanted by more detailed works that followed in its wake. Lubbock's Prehistoric Times (1865), Darwin's The Descent of Man (1871), James Archibald Geike's The Great Ice Age (1874) and William Boyd Dawkins' Early Man in Britain (1880) became the standard works on the fields to which Lyell had introduced a generation of mid-Victorian readers.

== See also ==
- Comparison with Huxley's Man's Place in Nature
