= Calcar avis =

Calcarine fissure wall

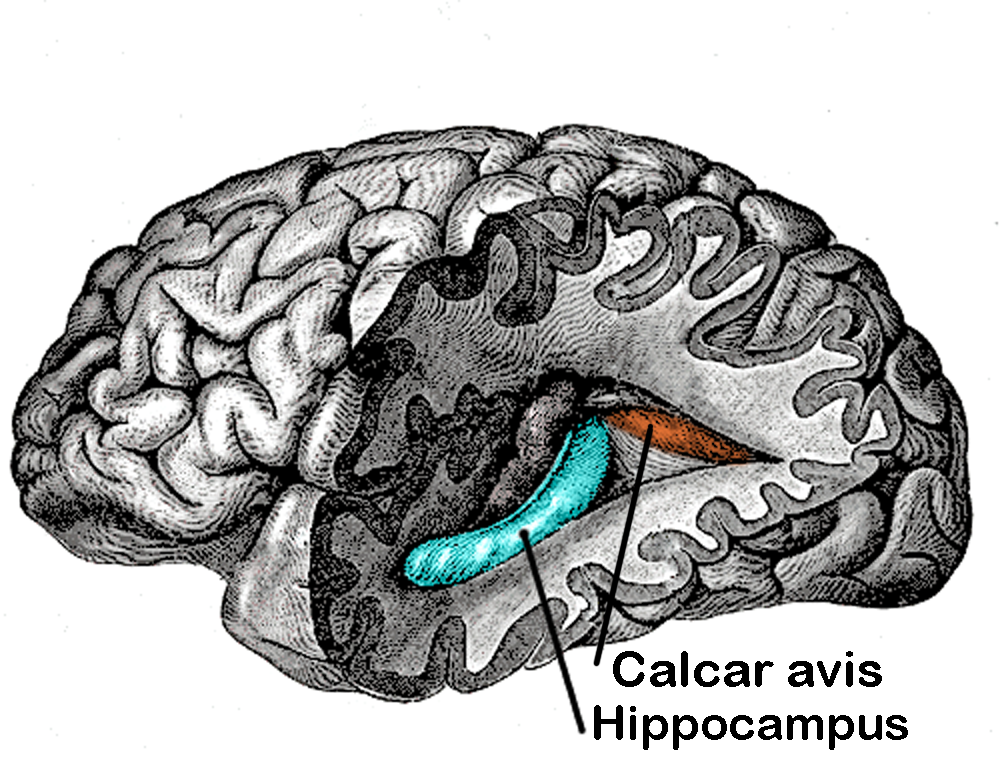
- Posterior and inferior cornua of left lateral ventricle exposed from the side.

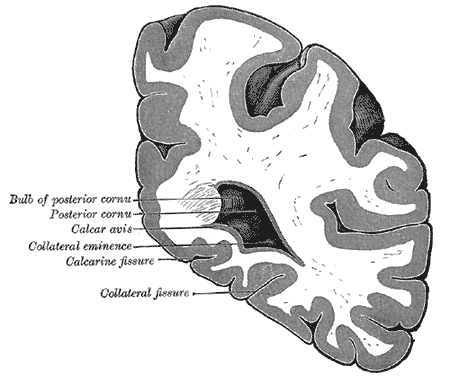
- Coronal section through posterior cornua of lateral ventricle.

Identifiers
- NeuroNames: 210
- TA98: A14.1.09.285
- TA2: 5660
- FMA: 83707

The calcar avis, (calcarine spur) previously known as the hippocampus minor, is an involution of the wall of the lateral ventricle's posterior horn produced by the calcarine fissure.

It is sometimes visible on ultrasound and can resemble a clot.

== Name ==
The ridge was originally described by anatomists as the calcar avis, while the ridge running along the floor of the temporal horn of the lateral ventricle was described by various names, in particular as the hippocampus. A classical allusion was introduced later with the term pes hippocampi, which may date back to Diemerbroeck in 1672, introducing a comparison with the shape of the folded back forelimbs and webbed feet of the Classical hippocampus (Greek: ἱππόκαμπος), a sea monster with a horse's forequarters and a fish's tail. At a subsequent stage the hippocampus was described as pes hippocampi major, with the calcar avis being named pes hippocampi minor.

The renaming of the hippocampus as hippocampus major, and the calcar avis as hippocampus minor, has been attributed to Félix Vicq-d'Azyr systematising nomenclature of parts of the brain in 1786. While "hippocampus minor" was used interchangeably with "calcar avis" for much of the 19th century, for a few years after 1861 the former name was subjected to publicity and ridicule when the hippocampus minor became the centre of a dispute over human evolution between Thomas Henry Huxley and Richard Owen, satirised as the Great Hippocampus Question. The term hippocampus minor fell from use in anatomy textbooks, and was officially removed in the Nomina Anatomica of 1895, but still featured in the Encyclopædia Britannica of 1926, and appeared in general dictionaries as late as 1957.

== Additional images ==
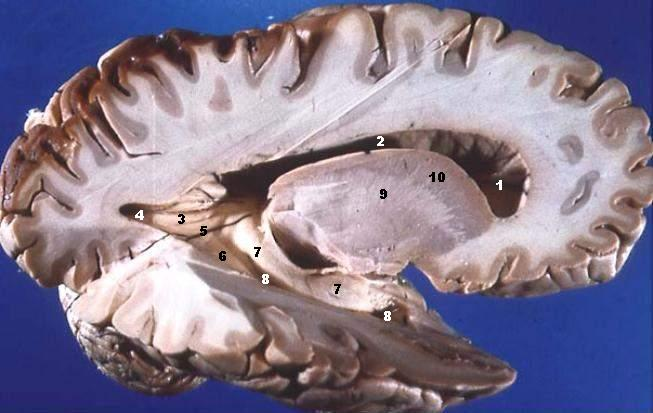
Human brain right dissected lateral view
