= Frances Joanna Bunbury =

English botanist (1814–1894)

Lady Frances Joanna Bunbury (née Horner; 1814–1894) was a British botanist, editor, and translator. She was married to Sir Charles Bunbury, 8th Baronet. She accompanied him on his palaeobotany trips, and collected barometric information for Charles Lyell. She published a translation of Cesare Balbo's Life and Times of Dante Alighieri, and edited and published her husband's diaries and correspondence after his death.

== Life ==
Frances Joanna Bunbury was born in London in 1814, and grew up in Bonn. Her parents were Leonard Horner and Anne Susan (or Susanna), daughter of Gamaliel Lloyd. She was the second of five daughters, and was well-educated. Leonard Horner educated all his daughters and took them with him to meetings of the British Association for the Advancement of Science.

Bunbury showed talent as a linguist and a botanist. She accompanied botanist Robert Brown on collecting trips in Switzerland. She was married to Charles Bunbury, a noted paleobotanist, in May 1844, and she often travelled with him. Bunbury did not enjoy good health, and visited Edinburgh for medical treatment in 1849. It was then she began her translation of Life and Times of Dante Alighieri from the original by Balbo. Her translation was published in 1852.

On a trip to Madeira in 1853 Bunbury contributed barometric measurements for her brother-in-law Charles Lyell. Charles Bunbury died in June 1886, and after this Bunbury worked on sorting and arranging his papers, diaries and correspondence, assisted by her sister Katherine Murray Lyell. Charles Bunbury's papers were published as a nine volume set in 1890, a three volume set in 1894, and a two-volume set in 1906. This final edition was after Bunbury's death, and was abbreviated by Katherine Lyell.

Bunbury died at Mildenhall in Suffolk on 21 July 1894, and was interred at Great Barton church.

== Written works ==
- Bunbury, Frances Joana (tr.). (1852). The Life and Times of Dante Alighieri by Balbo, Cesare, 1789-1853. Volume 1 Volume 2
- Bunbury, Frances Joana (Ed.). (1894). Life, Letters, and Journals of Sir Charles J. F. Bunbury, Bart. Volume 3
