= Mary Horner Lyell =

British geologist

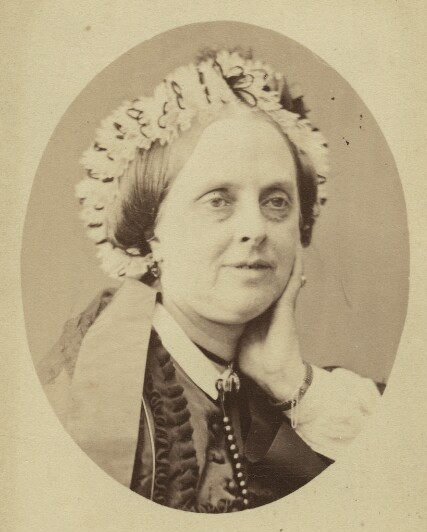
- Portrait c. Unknown date
- Born: Mary Elizabeth Horner; 9 October 1808; St Pancras, London, England
- Died: 24 April 1873 (aged 64); Kensington, London, England
- Resting place: Brookwood Cemetery; 51.297588°N 0.625097°W
- Other name: Mary Horner
- Occupations: Geologist and Conchologist
- Spouse: Charles Lyell (m. 1832–1873)
- Parent(s): Leonard Horner (father); Anna Lloyd Horner (mother)

Mary Horner Lyell (9 October 1808 – 24 April 1873) was a conchologist and geologist. She was married to the famed British geologist Charles Lyell and assisted him in his scientific work as his Interpreter (because of her fluency in French, German, Spanish, and Swedish languages), Scribe and Assistant Researcher. She never became widely known in her own right, although it is believed by historians that she likely made major contributions to her husband's work. Her own known independent work includes her studies in the Canary Islands, in which she studied land snails in 1854.

== Biography ==
Mary Elizabeth Horner was born in London in 1808. She was the eldest of six daughters of Leonard Horner, a professor of geology and educational reformer who taught in England and Germany and was also President of The Geological Society of London in 1846 and 1860. Leonard Horner was eager for all his children to be well educated, and hired personal tutors for his children.

Mary had a strong talent for learning different languages and was a polyglot. She could speak and write in French, German, Dutch, Spanish, and Swedish, which then became helpful for communicating with other geologists and literary figures.

One of Mary's sister was Frances Joanna Bunbury. She was the wife of Sir Charles James Fox Bunbury who was also a botanist and geologist. Benefiting from a quality education, all of Mary's sisters wrote their own original works or made translations for German/Italian articles. However, due to some unknown reason, Mary did not publish anything.

Mary became a conchologist and geologist while her younger sister Katharine became a botanist.

In 1832, aged 23, she married Charles Lyell (1787–1875), who was previously taught geology by her father. With her husband, she shared not only her love of geology but also a love of literature and friendship connections in the world of literature. Mary's sister Katharine married Charles Lyell's younger brother, Henry.

She died in 1873 while residing in London, just two years before the death of her husband. A short illness was determined to be the cause of her sudden and unforeseen death.

== Career ==
Mary and Charles Lyell were scientific partners; she accompanied him on field trips and assisted him by sketching geological drawings, packing their clothes, equipment and specimens, cataloguing their collections, learning Spanish and Swedish in addition to her spoken languages of French and German in order to assist with communications, and acting as a scribe when his eyesight failed in later years. Charles relied on her to help him source and catalogue specimens, write geological papers, and prepare lectures. Horner Lyell's sketches and paintings involved outcrops, geologic structures, and cross sections that her and her husband would find. She was a significant contributor to the famous book by her husband, "Principles of Geology".

Horner Lyell worked all over the globe, from Highlands of Scotland, England, Central Europe (Rhine and Rhone Valleys), Switzerland, North Italy, Denmark, Sweden, Norway, and various areas of North America, including Mississippi, Ohio, Georgia, New England, and Nova Scotia, and lastly Madeira and the Canary Islands. She is most well known for her scientific work in 1854, where she studied her collection of land snails from the Canary Islands. This study was comparable to Charles Darwin's study on birds and tortoises on the Galapagos Islands.

Horner Lyell collected and studied shells, specializing in mollusk shells. She catalogued more than 36 boxes of fossil shells brought back from the US by her and Charles in 1842.

Horner Lyell was a big part of Charles Lyell and Darwin's discussions of evolution. She also would supply Darwin with various goods and specimens, such as barnacles, which they would discuss together in letters. She also freely discussed geologic phenomena with other famous scientists and their wives, such as Gideon Mantell, Thomas Henry Huxley, and both Louis Agassiz and his second wife Elizabeth who was a naturalist.

Horner Lyell was involved in ‘geological politics.’ In 1873 the chair of Geology at Cambridge University became vacant, so she served as the campaign manager for candidate, Thomas McKenney Hughes, who was a Survey Officer at the Geological Survey. McKenney won and served in the position for 44 years, but sadly Horner Lyell died shortly afterward. The geologist Roderick Murchison noted her attendance at special meetings of the London Geological Society and it is clear that she had a keen interest and a thorough understanding of geology.

Horner Lyell was praised by Charles Darwin and described as "a monument of patience" when collaborating with Darwin and her husband. She was even so well liked by Americans that a tribute to her was published in the Boston Daily Advertiser which said: “There are many hearts in the United States that will be saddened by the death of this admirable woman… In every part of it [she] had made warm and lasting friends… Strength and sweetness were hers, both in no common measure…” Due to her overwhelming kindness and compassion, even the Boston Daily Advertiser published a tribute to honor her life.

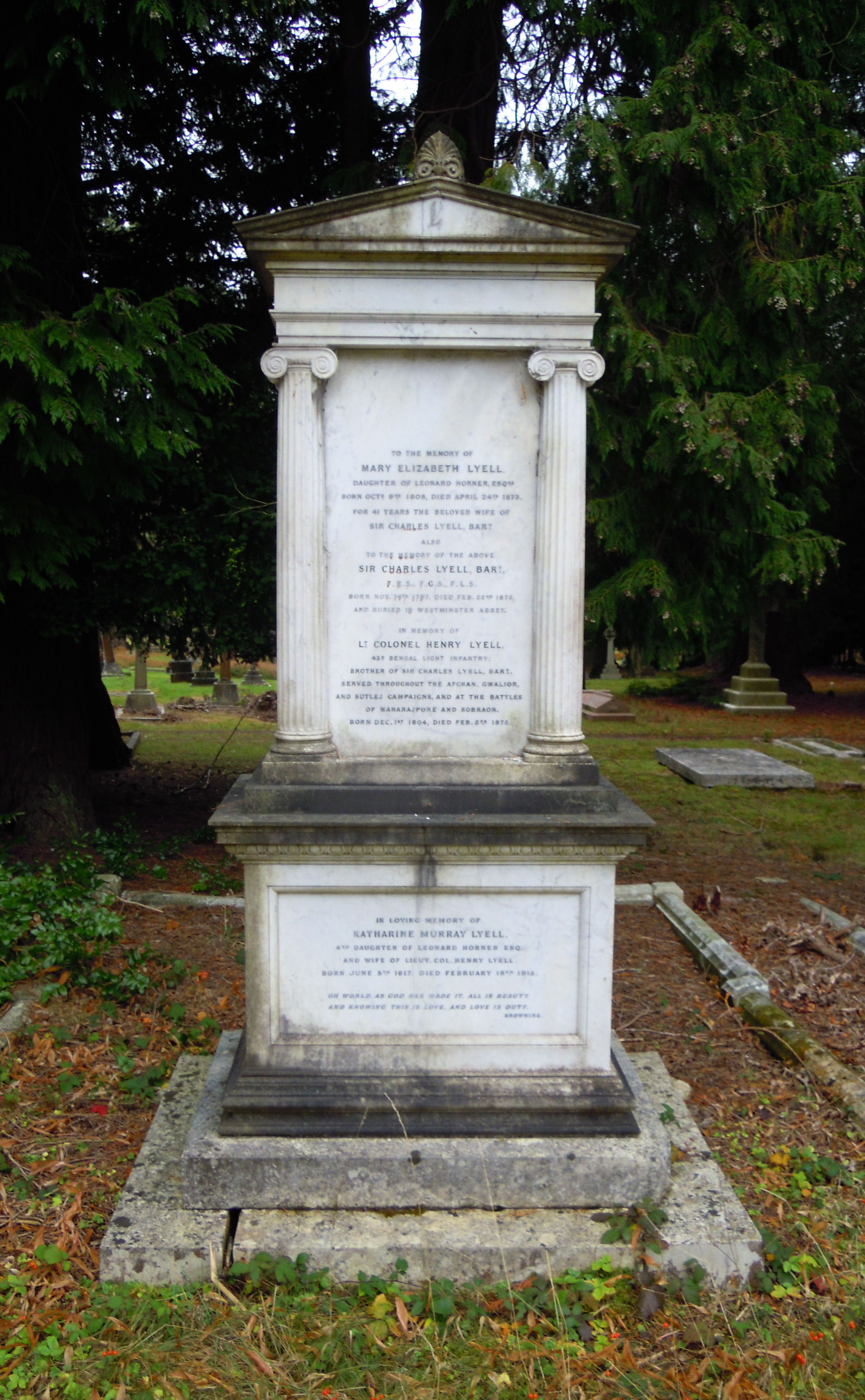
Grave of Mary Horner Lyell in Brookwood Cemetery

== Historical Context ==
Although Horner Lyell had adequate knowledge in the field of geology, her work was not viewed with the same attention by other geologists of her time. This would later be echoed by historians. Despite this, however, she did a considerable amount of work and research. Most notably, her travel to the Canary Islands to study land snails. Her geological knowledge and work would have made her an accomplished geologist had she not been restricted to the social and gendered norms of her time.

Due to the social limitations Horner Lyell faced due to being a woman, a large amount of her work is not credited with her name. If she had been researching in a more contemporary time, her work could have held its own, rather than being merged with Charles’ name and work. In a letter written by Charles Lyell, he refers to the mathematician Mary Somerville, and states "had our friend Mrs. Somerville been married to La Place, or some mathematician, we should never have heard of her work. She would have merged it in her husband's and passed it off as his." Historian's believe that by saying this, he was possibly referring to his wife, Mary, merging her work with his and therefore losing credit.

In 1833 Horner Lyell was a strong advocate for women's rights to attend lectures at King's College in London. Charles Lyell allowed this and found half of his lectures out of 250 attendees were attended by women. In 1870 she attended a meeting of the members and supporters of the National Society for Women's Suffrage which was addressed by Millicent Fawcett, and also attended by Fawcett's sister, Elizabeth Garrett Anderson. Then in 1871, the Council for the Society of Arts set up a committee to promote the better education of women of all classes and Lyell sat on this committee.

== Letters ==
Horner Lyell often read books, drew pictures, and wrote letters for her husband Charles due to his weak eyesight. She wrote dozens of letters to friends, families and colleagues, which detailed her and her husband's daily lives as well as their work. Her letters correspond greatly to their geological trip through Norway in 1837, which detailed them meeting with various geological professors and biologists, as well as the work they did during their travels.

Due to Horner Lyell's knowledge of several languages, she was able to correspond with and translate letters from European professors, likely allowing her and her husband to further their research and gain further connections in the scientific field.

Horner Lyell also corresponded by letters with Darwin. In their letters they discuss shells and barnacle specimens that she provided for Darwin as well as the Scottish glens, and in another letter he goes on to ask her for Swedish to English translations of texts he was attempting to study, extending Horner Lyell's translator abilities beyond her husband.

She also corresponded in writing with American figures such as the educator, naturalist, and writer Elizabeth Agassiz about the glacial geology of South America, and with the physician, politician, and naturalist William Prescott.

== Honours ==
A crater on the planet Venus was named Horner in her honor, see List of craters on Venus.
