= Lyell Butte =

Landform in the Grand Canyon, Arizona

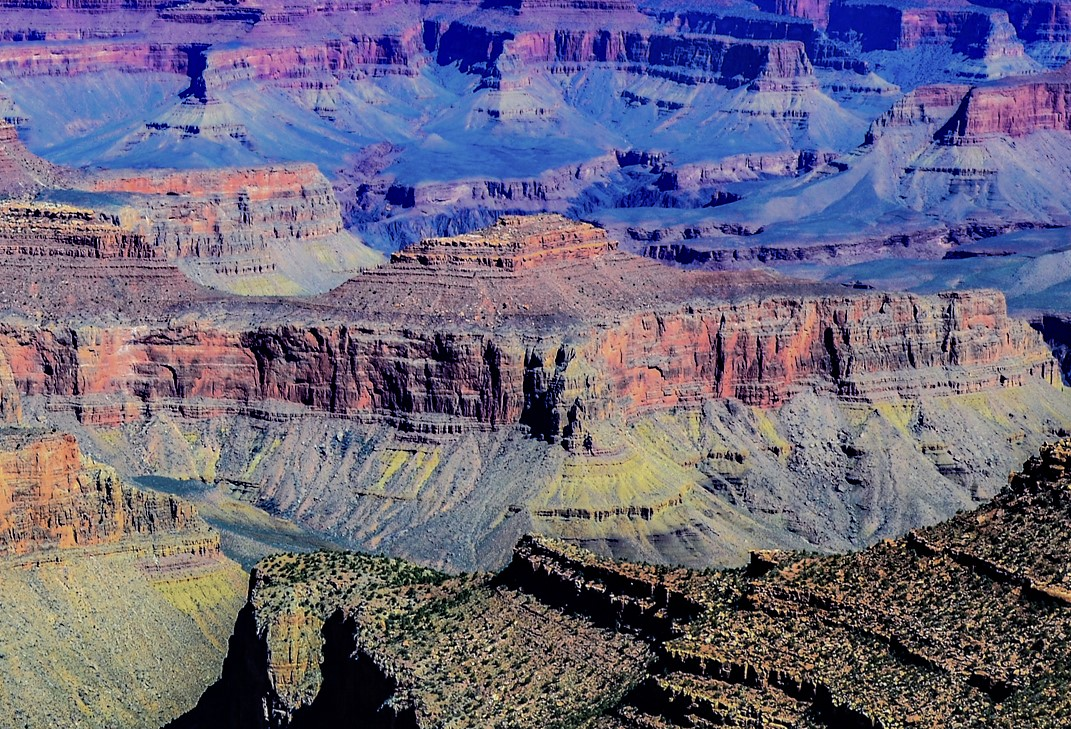
- Lyell Butte, south aspect

Highest point
- Elevation: 5,362 ft (1,634 m)
- Prominence: 502 ft (153 m)
- Parent peak: Newton Butte (5,940 ft)
- Isolation: 1.55 mi (2.49 km)
- Coordinates: 36°02′49″N 112°01′44″W

Naming
- Etymology: Charles Lyell

Geography
- Location within Arizona Location within the United States
- Country: United States
- State: Arizona
- County: Coconino
- Protected area: Grand Canyon National Park
- Parent range: Coconino Plateau; Colorado Plateau
- Topo map: USGS Phantom Ranch

Geology
- Rock type(s): sandstone, limestone, shale

Climbing
- First ascent: 1970
- Easiest route: class 4 climbing

Lyell Butte is a 5,362-foot (1,634 m) elevation summit located in the Grand Canyon, in Coconino County of northern Arizona, United States. It is situated six miles (9.7 km) east of Grand Canyon Village, immediately east of and below Shoshone Point, and 1.5 mile southeast of Newton Butte, which is the nearest higher neighbor. Topographic relief is significant as Lyell Butte rises 2,800 feet (850 m) above the Colorado River in 1.5 mile (2.4 km). Access is via the Tonto Trail which traverses the base of the peak. According to the Köppen climate classification system, Lyell Butte is located in a cold semi-arid climate zone, with precipitation runoff draining northeast to the Colorado River via Grapevine and Boulder Creeks.

== History ==
Lyell Butte was named in 1906 after Sir Charles Lyell (1797–1875), eminent Scottish geologist best known as the author of Principles of Geology. This feature's name was officially adopted in 1906 by the U.S. Board on Geographic Names. The first ascent of Lyell Butte was made January 24, 1970, by Alan Doty via the northwest face/chimney.

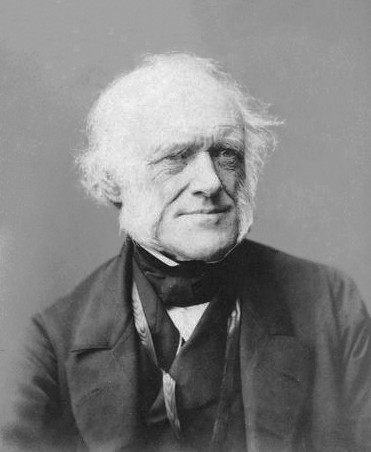
Sir Charles Lyell

== Geology ==
Lyell Butte is composed of Mississippian Redwall Limestone, with a dome of the basal layer of Pennsylvanian-Permian Supai Group on top which dips to the northeast. The cliff-forming Redwall overlays the Cambrian Tonto Group, and below that Paleoproterozoic Vishnu Basement Rocks at river level in Granite Gorge.

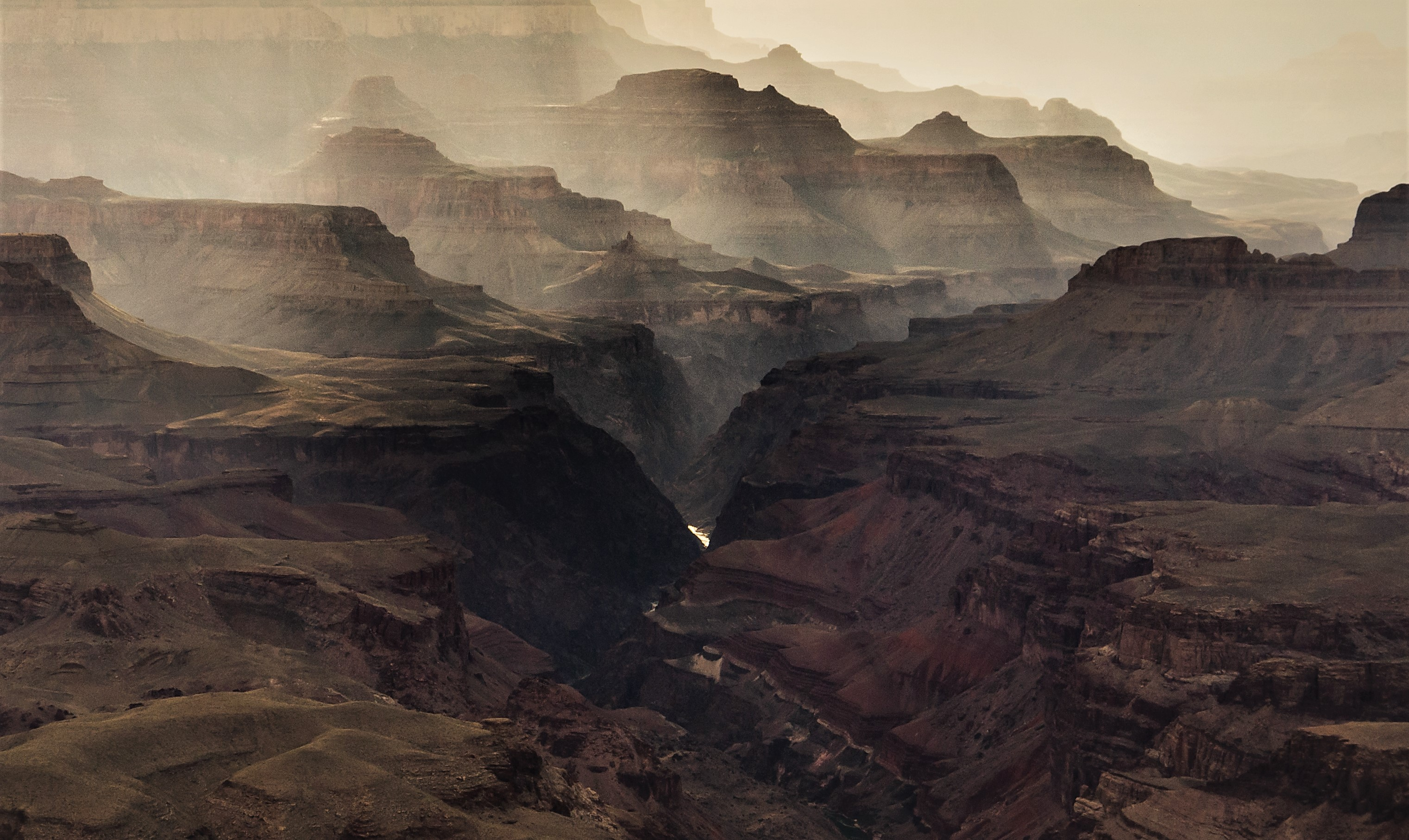
Newton Butte centered, Lyell Butte to left. Newberry Butte to right on opposite side of Granite Gorge

== See also ==
- Geology of the Grand Canyon area
