= Newton Butte =

Prominence in the Grand Canyon, Arizona, United States

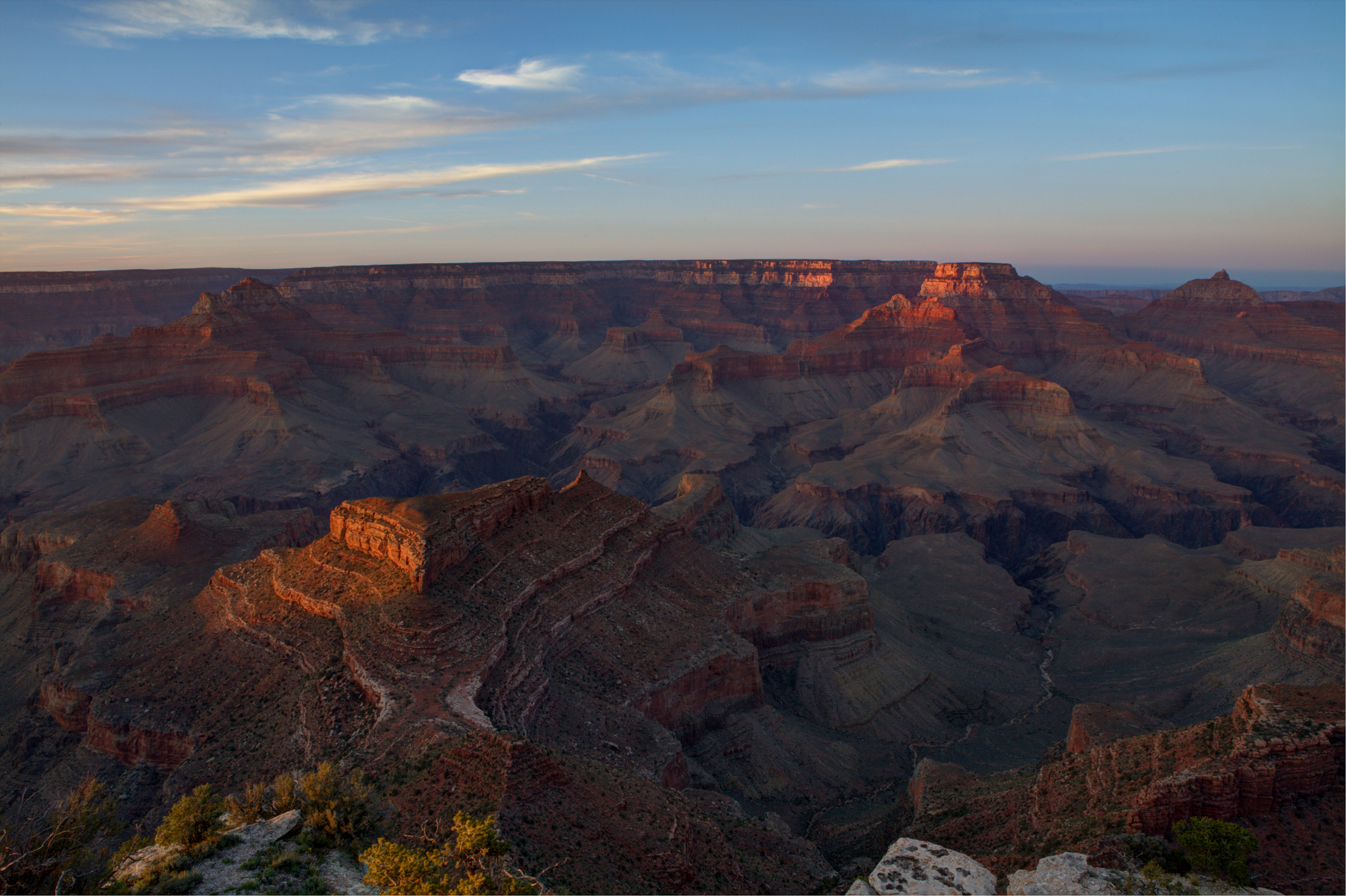
- Newton Butte (lower left), from Shoshone Point

Highest point
- Elevation: 5,940 ft (1,811 m)
- Prominence: 520 ft (158 m)
- Coordinates: 36°03′37″N 112°03′11″W

Geography
- Location within Arizona
- Location: Grand Canyon National Park; Coconino County, Arizona, U.S.
- Topo map: USGS Phantom Ranch

Geology
- Mountain type(s): Coconino Sandstone (prominence), Hermit Formation, Supai Group (redbeds), Muav Limestone

Newton Butte, in the Grand Canyon, Arizona, United States is a prominence below the South Rim, northwest of Grandview Point, and north on a ridgeline from Shoshone Point which is one mile east of Yaki Point, East Rim Drive. Shoshone Point and Yaki are both on access roads from East Rim Drive, with Yaki being the more advantageous to different viewing directions.

Newton Butte is 5,940 feet (1,811 m), and located on a point/ridge, just south of Granite Gorge on the Colorado River. The point location of Newton Butte extends due north from an intermediate point on the South Rim, Shoshone Point, which at the end of the Newton Butte point ridgeline, also forms the west perimeter of the Lonetree Canyon drainage, into Granite Gorge.

Just north of Newton Butte, 3/4 mi on the end of the point, is Pattie Butte, a lower elevation prominence, 5,306 feet (1,617 m).

Two hiking trails are closest to Newton Butte. Across Granite Gorge, views south can be made from the Clear Creek Trail, at lower elevations or as it climbs past Zoroaster Canyon to ridgelines at the west of Clear Creek. The Tonto Trail on the Tonto Platform, south side of Granite Gorge, has the closest hiking points near the bottom elevations of Newton Butte.

Newton Butte is named for Sir Isaac Newton (1642–1727), and was officially adopted in 1906 by the U.S. Board on Geographic Names.

== Access ==
Newton Butte can be viewed from the South Rim viewpoints from Yavapai Point, Yaki Point, Shoshone Point, or Grandview Point. Access to East Rim Drive. South Rim, is from the east, on Arizona State Route 64, from US 89. A west access to East Rim Drive is from Williams, Arizona, or Flagstaff, by way of U.S. Route 180 in Arizona.

== Gallery ==
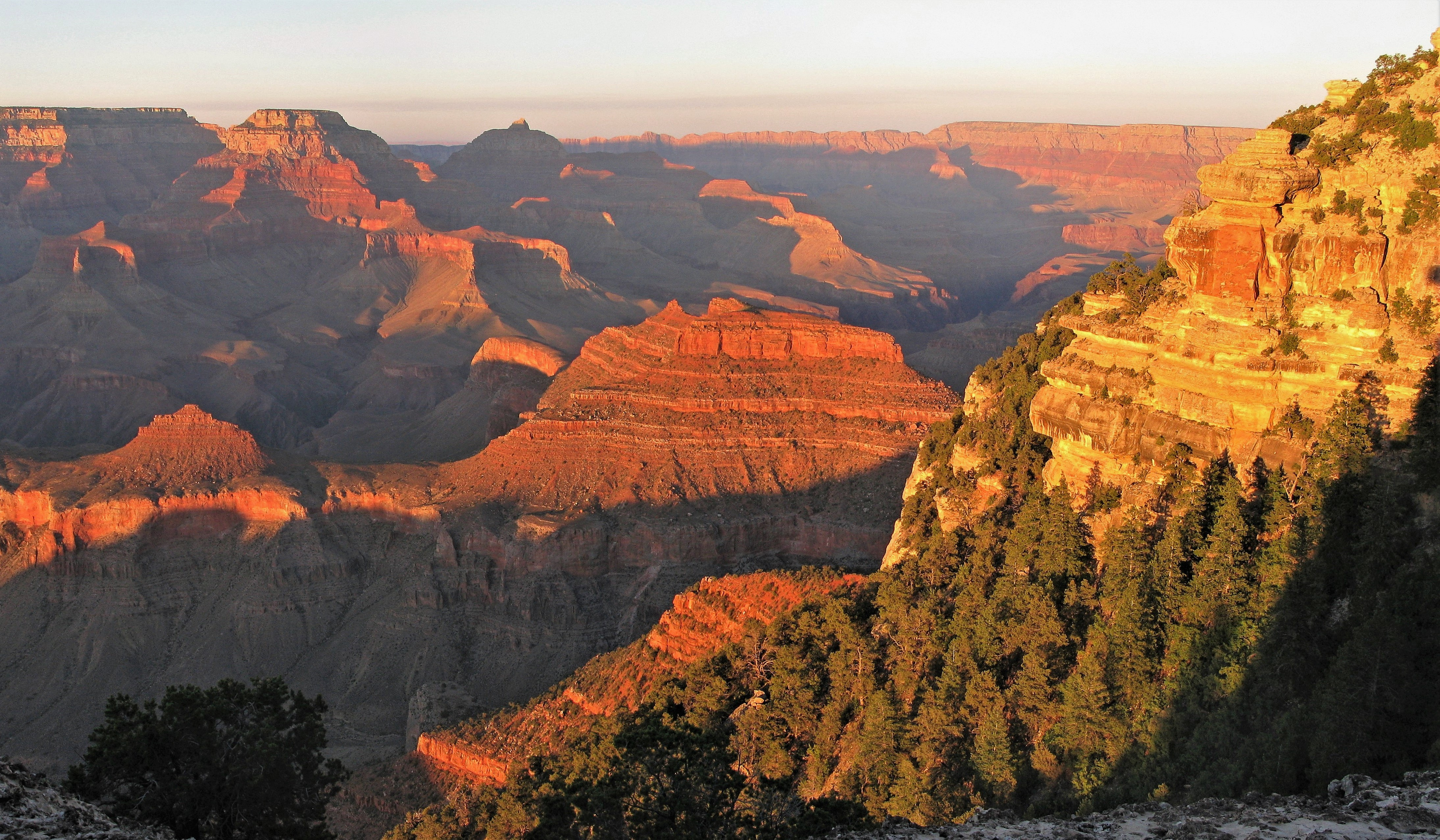
Newton Butte in bullseye, from Yaki Point. (Pattie Butte lower left)

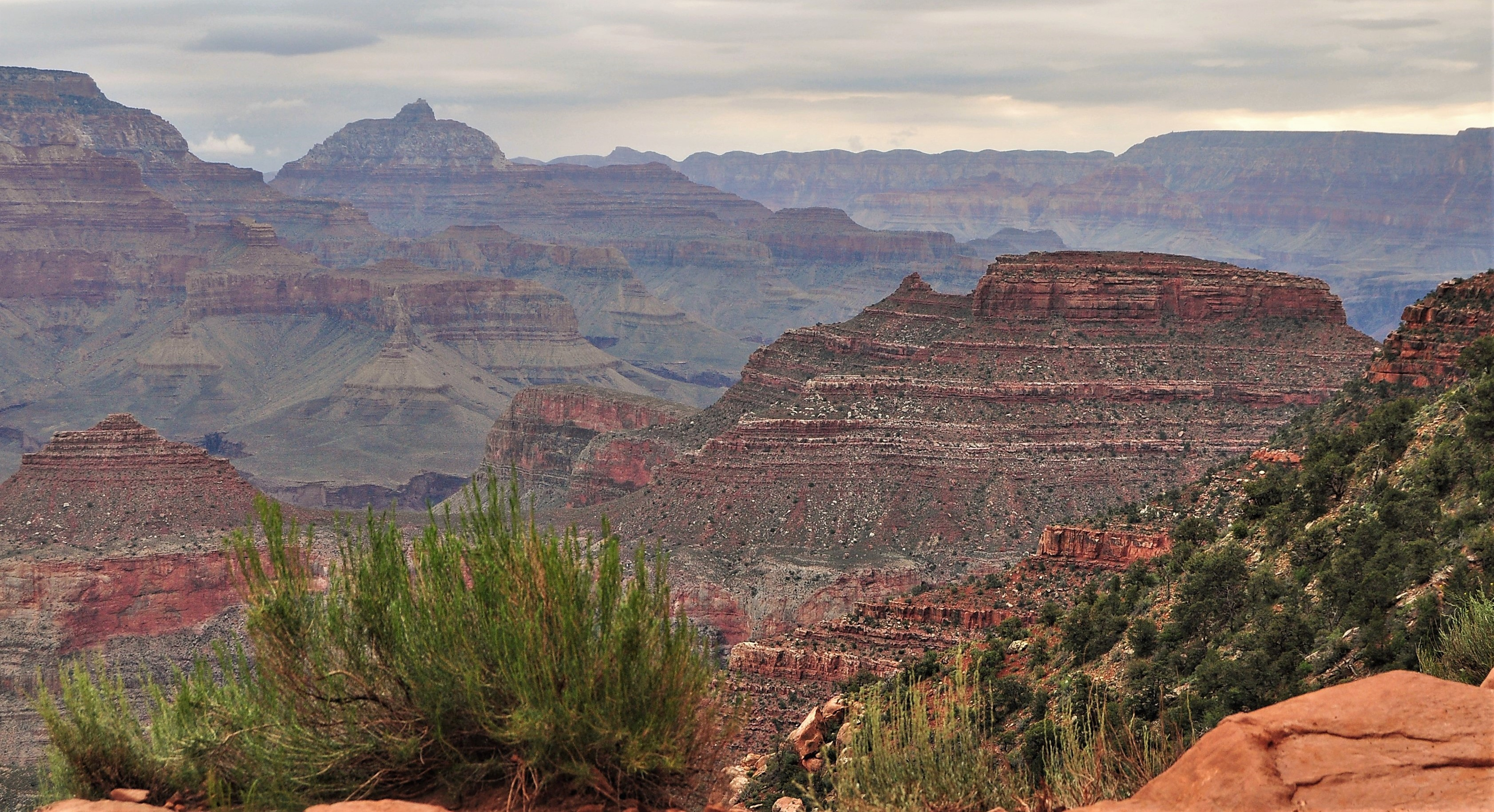
Newton Butte on the right

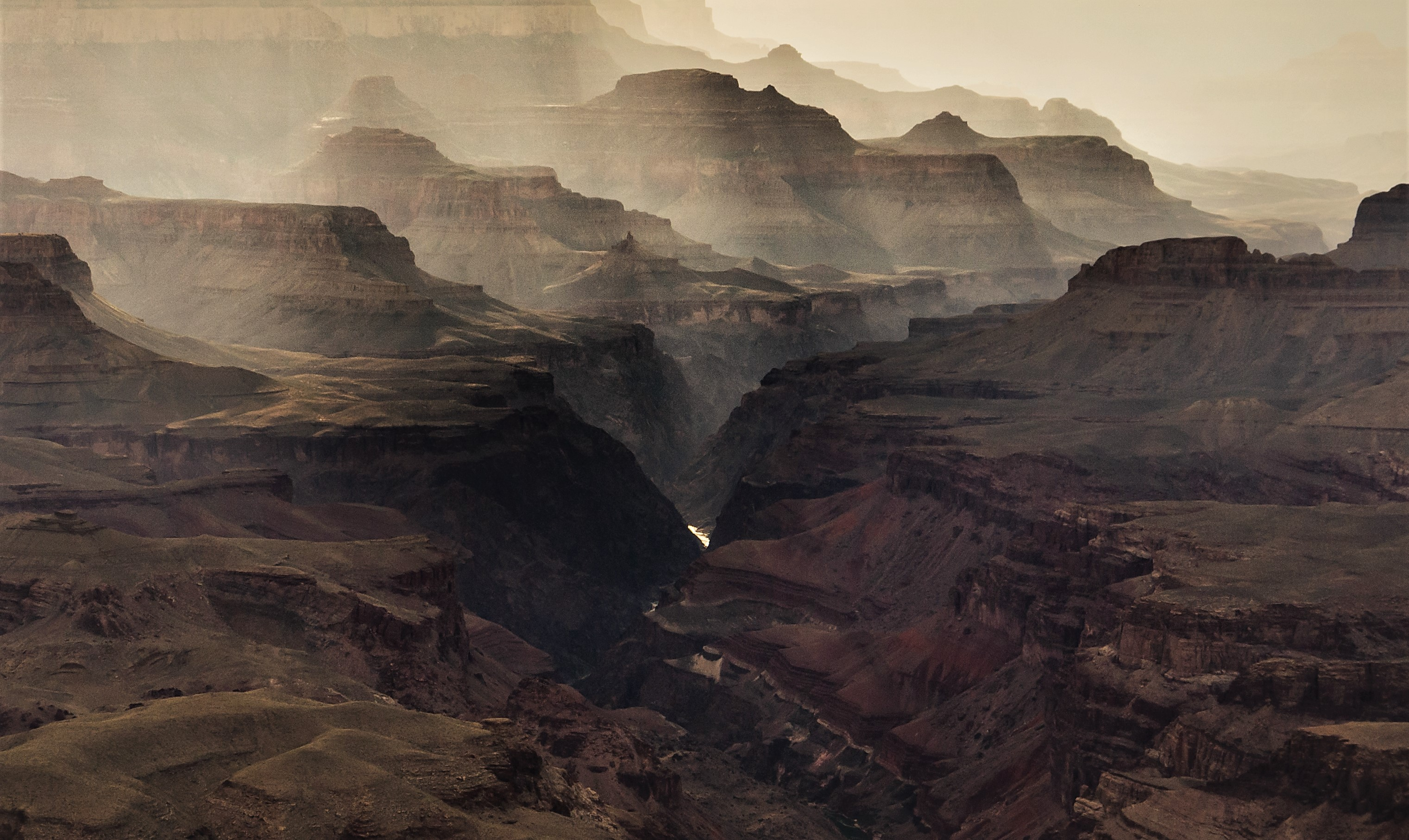
Newton Butte centered, from the east.
(Lyell Butte to left, Newberry Butte to right)

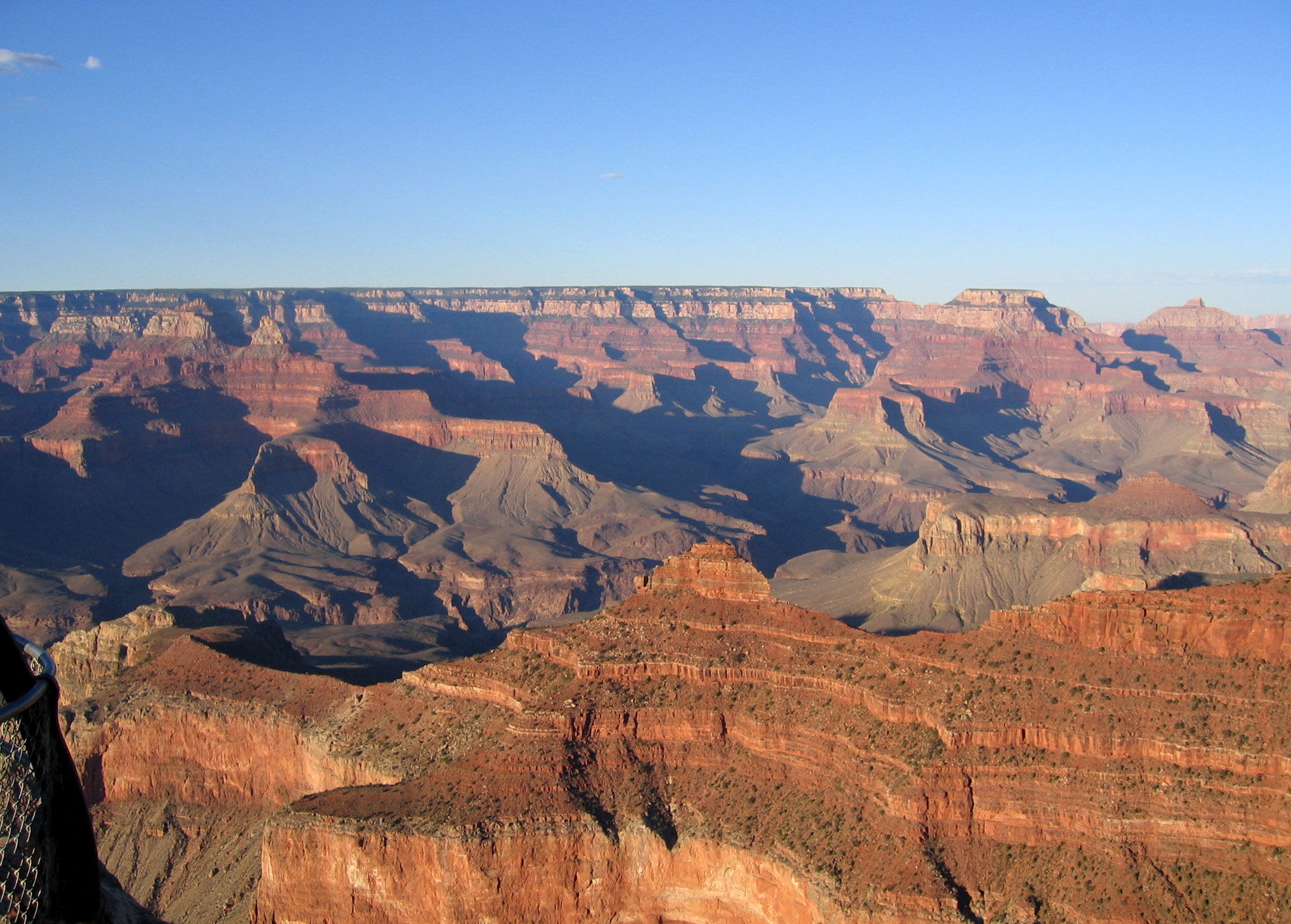
O'Neill Butte, (above Supai Group 'redbeds'), on ridgeline from Yaki Point; (Newton Butte prominence off photo, right)
View northeast, with Cape Royal (point) on Walhalla Plateau (Kaibab Plateau), and flat-top of Wotans Throne and Vishnu Temple prominence.
(from Yavapai Point, west of Yaki Point, South Rim)

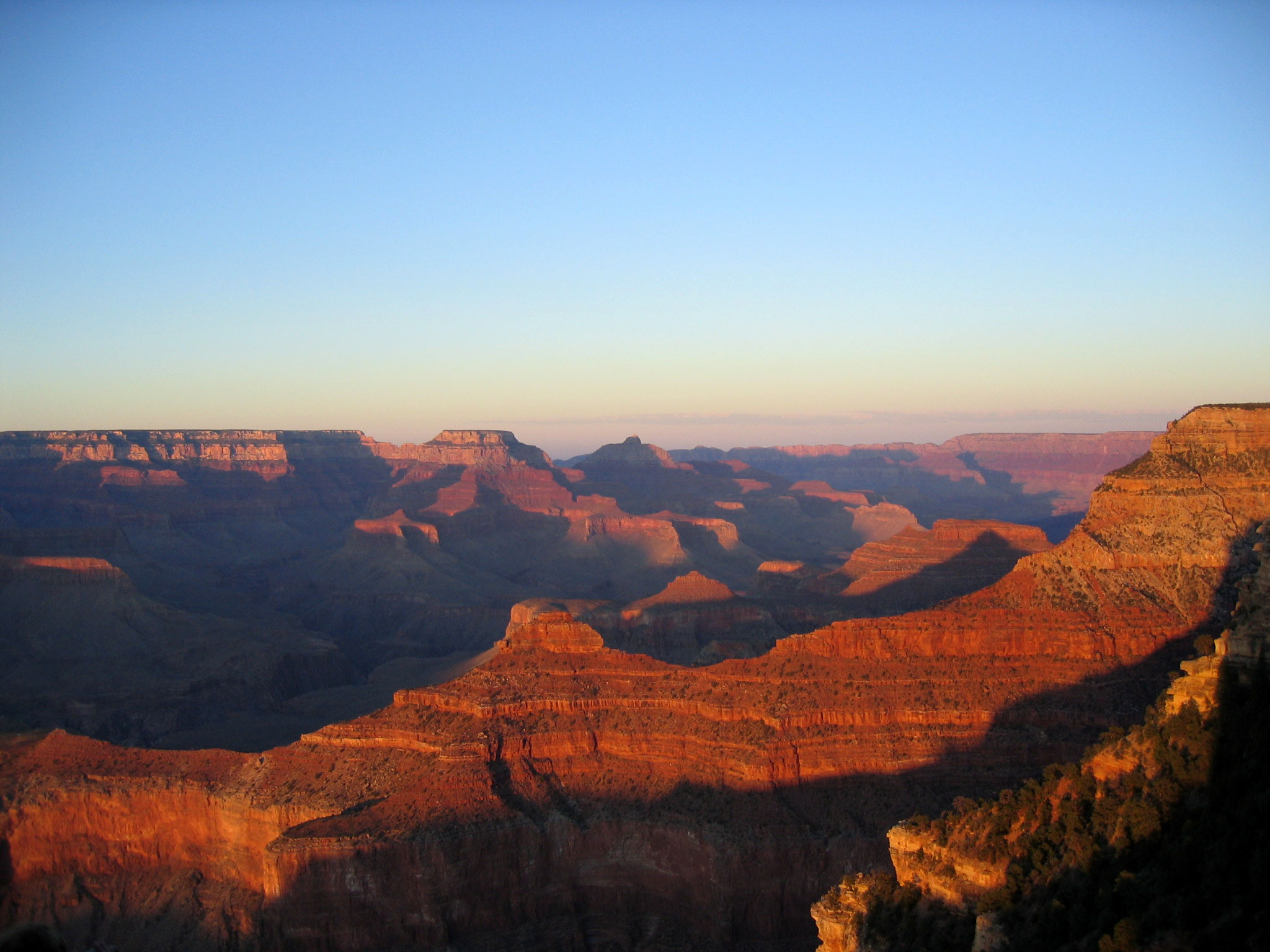
(view east-northeast, from Mather Point-(Yavapai Point))
O'Neill Butte, on ridgeline north, from Newton Butte. Pattie Butte sits on an upper platform of Redwall Limestone, overlain by a 2nd-platform of Surprise Canyon Formation. (partly eroded)

== See also ==
- The Howlands Butte, across Granite Gorge, ~2 mi
