= Katharine Murray Lyell =

British botanist (1817–1915)

- Born: Katharine Murray Horner; 1817
- Died: 1915 (aged 97–98)
- Other names: K.M. Lyell
- Spouse: Henry Lyell
- Scientific career
- Fields: Botany

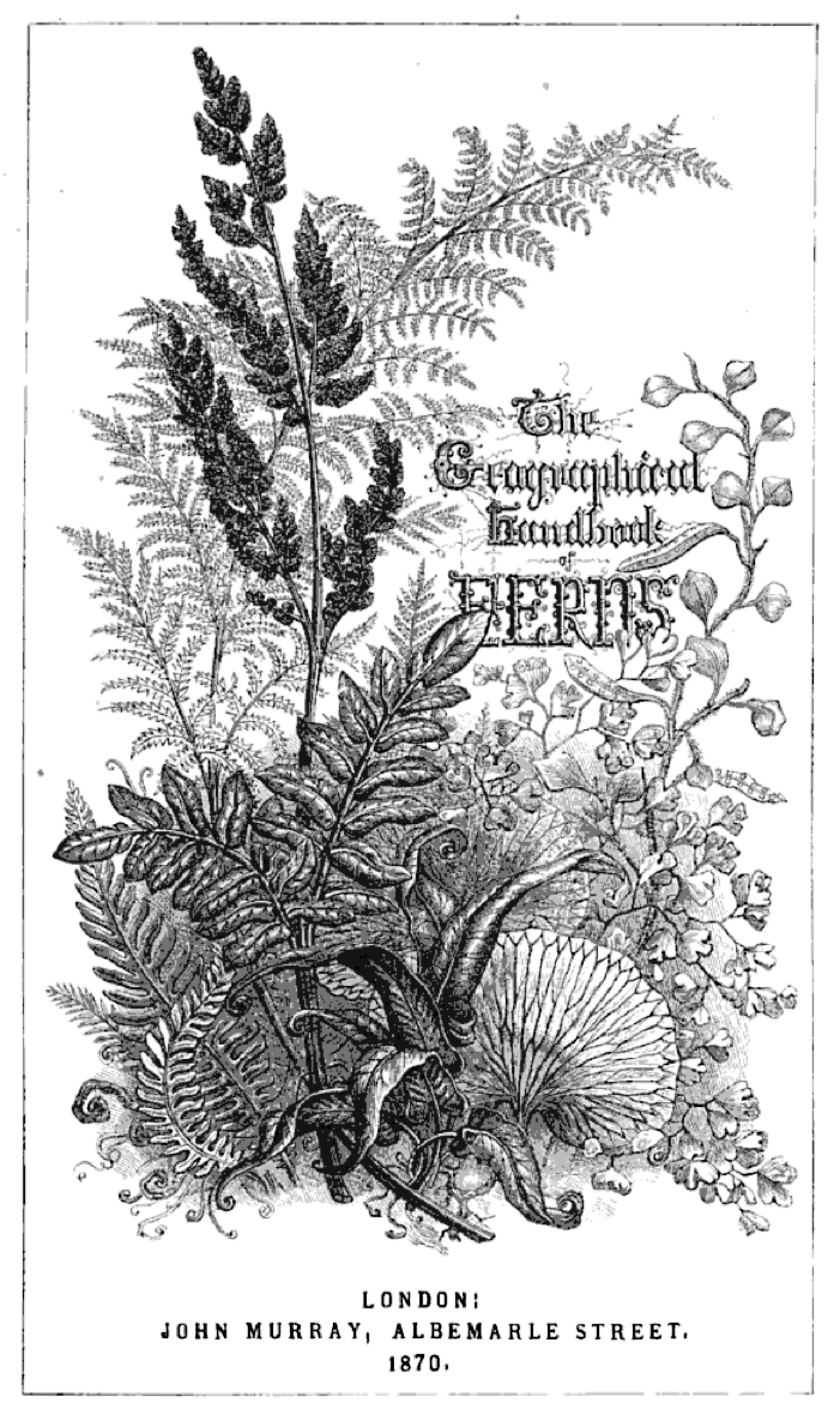
Frontispiece from Katharine Murray Lyell's 1870 book A Geographical Handbook of All the Known Ferns. (The book's title appears in truncated form on this page.)

Katharine Murray Lyell (1817–1915) was a British botanist, author of an early book on the worldwide distribution of ferns, and editor of volumes of the correspondence of several of the era's notable scientists.

== Biography ==
Katharine Murray Horner was one of six daughters of the Scottish merchant and geologist Leonard Horner. Leonard Horner educated his daughters well and took them with him to meetings of the British Association for the Advancement of Science.

Katharine Horner's older sister Mary was a geologist and conchologist who married the geologist Charles Lyell. Katharine Horner subsequently married Charles Lyell's younger brother, Henry. Their oldest son, Leonard, became a member of Parliament.

As a botanist, Katharine Lyell specialized in ferns and in 1870 published a volume on the geographic distribution of ferns worldwide. In her preface, she acknowledges a debt to William Jackson Hooker's unfinished compendium of ferns, Synopsis Filicum (posthumously published in 1868), but Lyell's book was the first to be organized around the geography of ferns rather than more usual taxonomic categories. She traveled to India with Henry, where she collected plants in several regions including the Ganges delta, and she corresponded with such eminent Victorians of her day as the scientists Alfred Russel Wallace and Charles Darwin and the missionary Harriette Colenso (who collected ferns for her). Her fern collection is shared between Kew Gardens and The University of Reading Herbarium (RNG), while her other plants went to the British Museum.

Lyell undertook the editorship of volumes of correspondence and memoirs of three of her era's outstanding scientists. When her brother-in-law Charles died in 1875, she became the compiler and editor of a two-volume edition of his life, letters, and journals. A decade later, following her father's death, she edited two volumes of his letters. She also edited the life and letters of another of her brothers-in-law, Charles Bunbury, a noted paleobotanist. All are still being cited by scholars researching the period.

== Publications ==
The standard author abbreviation K.Lyell is used to indicate this person as the author when citing a botanical name.

- Katharine Lyell. A Geographical Handbook of All the Known Ferns: With Tables to Show Their Distribution. London: John Murray, 1870.
- Katharine Lyell, ed. The Life, Letters and Journals of Sir Charles Lyell. London: John Murray, 1881.
- Katharine Lyell, ed. Memoir of Leonard Horner, F.R.S., F.G.S.: Consisting of Letters to his Family and from Some of his Friends. London: Women's Printing Society, 1890.
- Katharine Lyell, ed. The Life and Letters of Sir Charles J.F. Bunbury. London: John Murray, 1906.
