= Leonard Horner =

Scottish merchant, geologist and educational reformer (1785–1864)

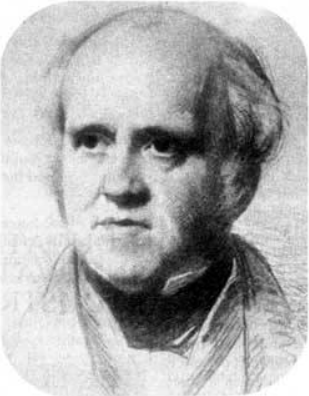
Leonard Horner c. 1830

Leonard Horner FRSE FRS FGS (17 January 1785 – 5 March 1864) was a Scottish merchant, geologist and educational reformer. He was the younger brother of Francis Horner.

Horner was a founder of the School of Arts of Edinburgh, now Heriot-Watt University and one of the founders of the Edinburgh Academy. A 'radical educational reformer' he was involved in the establishment of University College School. As a commissioner on the Royal Commission on the Employment of Children in Factories, Horner arguably did more to improve the working conditions of women and children in North England than any other person in the 19th century.

== Early life and education ==
His father, John Horner, was a linen merchant in Edinburgh, and partner in the firm of Inglis & Horner. Leonard, the third and youngest son, attended the High School and entered the University of Edinburgh in 1799. There in the course of the next four years he studied chemistry and mineralogy, and gained a love of geology from Playfairs Illustrations of the Huttonian Theory. At the age of nineteen he became a partner in a branch of his father's business, and went to London.

== Career ==
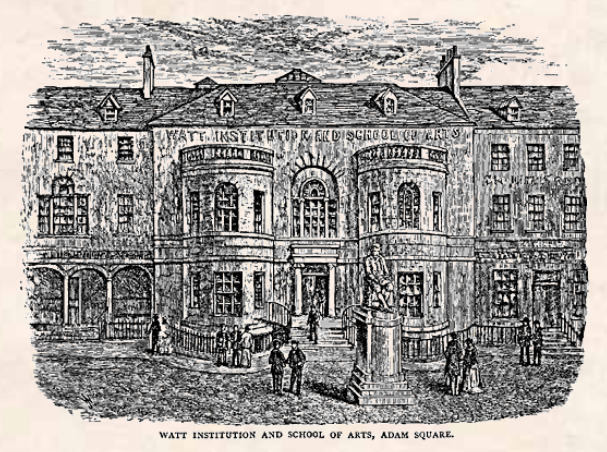
Adam Square in Edinburgh with Horner's School of Arts in the Centre

In 1808 he joined the newly formed Geological Society of London and two years later was elected one of the secretaries. Throughout his long life he was ardently devoted to the welfare of the society; he was elected president in 1846 and again in 1860. In 1811 he read his first paper On the Mineralogy of the Malvern Hills (Trans. Geol. Soc. vol. i.) and subsequently communicated other papers on the Brine-springs at Droitwich, and the Geology of the S.W. part of Somersetshire.

He was elected fellow of the Royal Society in 1813. In 1815 he returned to Edinburgh to take personal superintendence of his business, and while there (1821) he was instrumental in founding the Edinburgh School of Arts on Adam Square where the instruction of mechanics and art was taught, and he was one of the founders of the Edinburgh Academy. In 1827 he was invited to London to become warden of London University (now University College London), an office which he held for four years; he then resided at Bonn for two years and pursued the study of minerals and rocks, communicating to the Geological Society on his return a paper on the Geology of the Environs of Bonn, and another On the Quantity of Solid Matter suspended in the Water of the Rhine. He made significant contributions to the study of loess material and loess deposits and published what is probably the first illustration of a loess section. He also produced the first map of the Siebengebirge region of the Rhineland.

In 1828 he returned to Edinburgh to take charge of his ailing father's company. In 1829, on the death of his father, he took full charge of the company, and continued in this role until 1833.

In 1833 he was appointed one of the commissioners to inquire into the employment of children in the factories of Great Britain, and he was subsequently selected as one of the inspectors. He held this post for 26 years and during this time arguably did more to improve the working condition of women and children in the mills of north England than any other person in the 19th century and for which he was praised by Karl Marx in Das Kapital. In later years he devoted much attention to the geological history of the alluvial lands of Egypt; and in 1843 he published his Life of his brother Francis.

== Family ==
Horner married Anna Susanna Lloyd, daughter of Gamaliel Lloyd.

They had six daughters, all of whom educated to a high standard for the age. The eldest, Mary Elizabeth, married Sir Charles Lyell, author of The Principles of Geology in 1832. Her younger sister Katharine married Lyell's younger brother Henry in 1848, and later edited The Life, Letters and Journals of Sir Charles Lyell. A third daughter, Frances, married Charles Bunbury, a noted paleobotanist. A fourth daughter, Leonora, married Georg Heinrich Pertz, a historian and archivist; one of their children was Dorothea Pertz and through this connection Horner was the step-great-great-grandfather of astronomer and astrophysicist Cecilia Payne-Gaposchkin. Two other daughters, Susan and Joanna, were known in their day as the authors of a book on walking tours of Florence, Italy.

== Freemasonry ==
He was Initiated into Scottish Freemasonry in 1803 in Lodge Canongate Kilwinning, No.2. He was also an honorary member of Lodge Kirknewton and Ratho, No.85, this also being conferred in 1803.

== Death ==
He died in Montagu Square in London on 5 March 1864.
