= Sir Charles Bunbury, 8th Baronet =

English naturalist (1809–1886)

Charles James Fox Bunbury
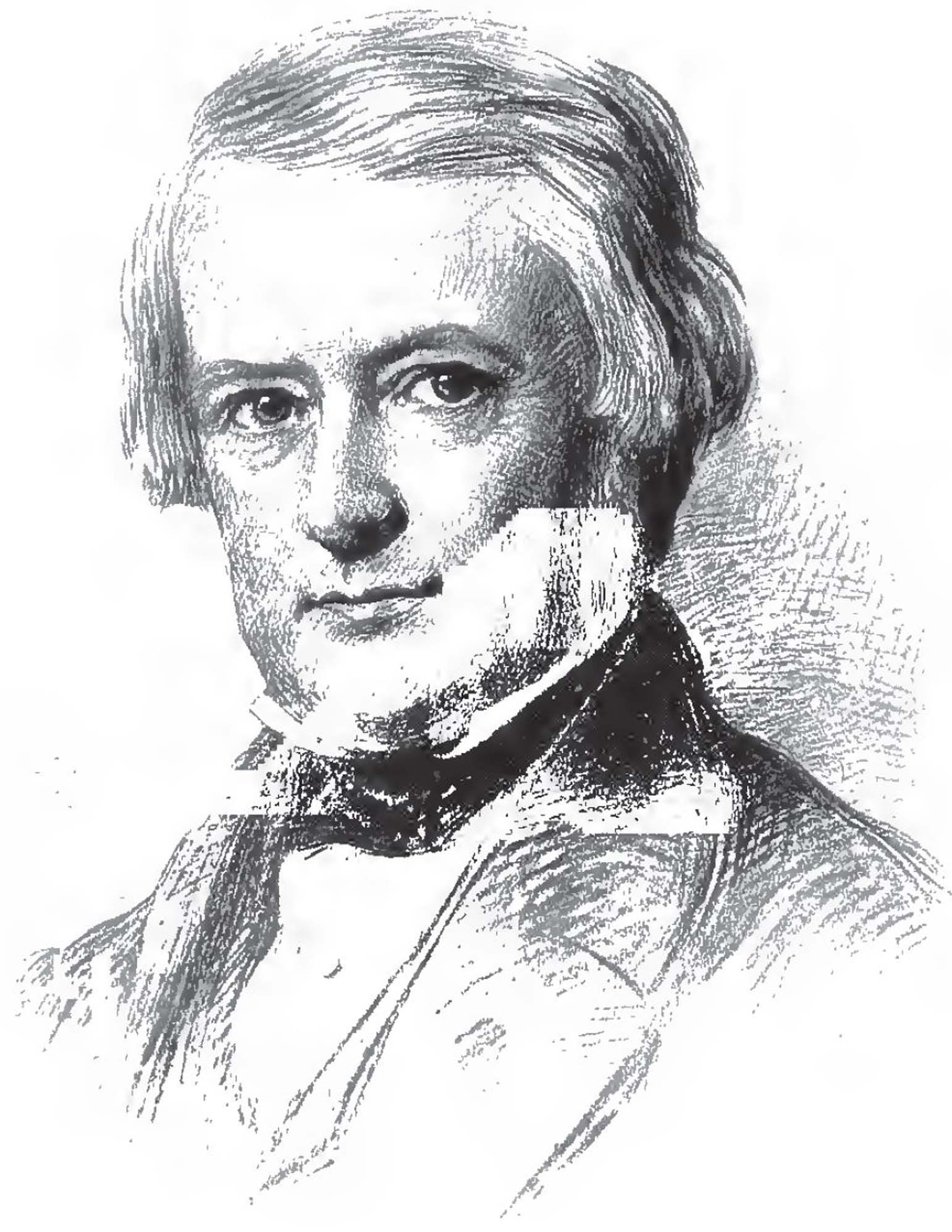
- Charles Bunbury, by Eden Upton Eddis
- Born: 4 February 1809
- Died: 18 June 1886 (aged 77)
- Occupation: British baronet
- Spouse: Frances Horner

Sir Charles James Fox Bunbury, 8th Baronet of Barton Hall, Suffolk, (4 February 1809 – 18 June 1886) was an English naturalist and Fellow of the Royal Society.

He was born in Messina, the eldest son of Sir Henry Bunbury, 7th Baronet and Louisa Amelia Fox and was educated at Trinity College, Cambridge. He married Frances Joanna Horner, daughter of Leonard Horner, on 31 May 1844 in London. They had no children.

He was a justice of the peace and deputy lieutenant for Suffolk and in 1868 was appointed High Sheriff of Suffolk.

He was a keen botanist and geologist with a particular interest in palaeobotany. He collected plant specimens on expeditions to South America in 1833 and South Africa in 1838. He also accompanied his great friend Sir Charles Lyell, the geologist, on an expedition to Madeira. He was elected a Fellow of the Royal Society in 1851.

He died at Barton Hall, Bury, Suffolk, in 1886 and was succeeded in his title by his younger brother Sir Edward Herbert Bunbury, 9th Baronet.

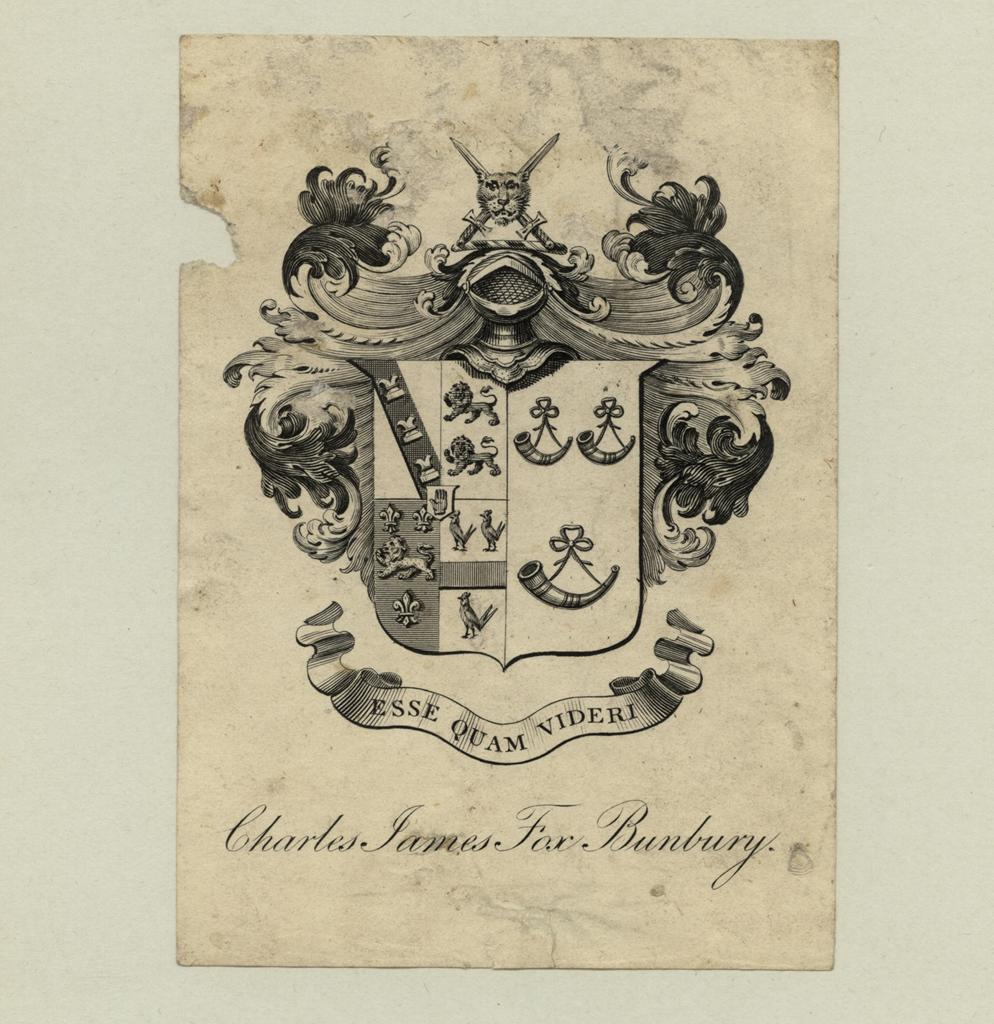
Bookplate of Sir Charles Bunbury

Baronetage of England
| Preceded by Henry Edward Bunbury | Baronet (of Bunbury, Oxon); 1860–1886 | Succeeded by Edward Herbert Bunbury |
