= Charles Lyell =

Scottish geologist (1797–1875)

Sir Charles Lyell Bt FRS
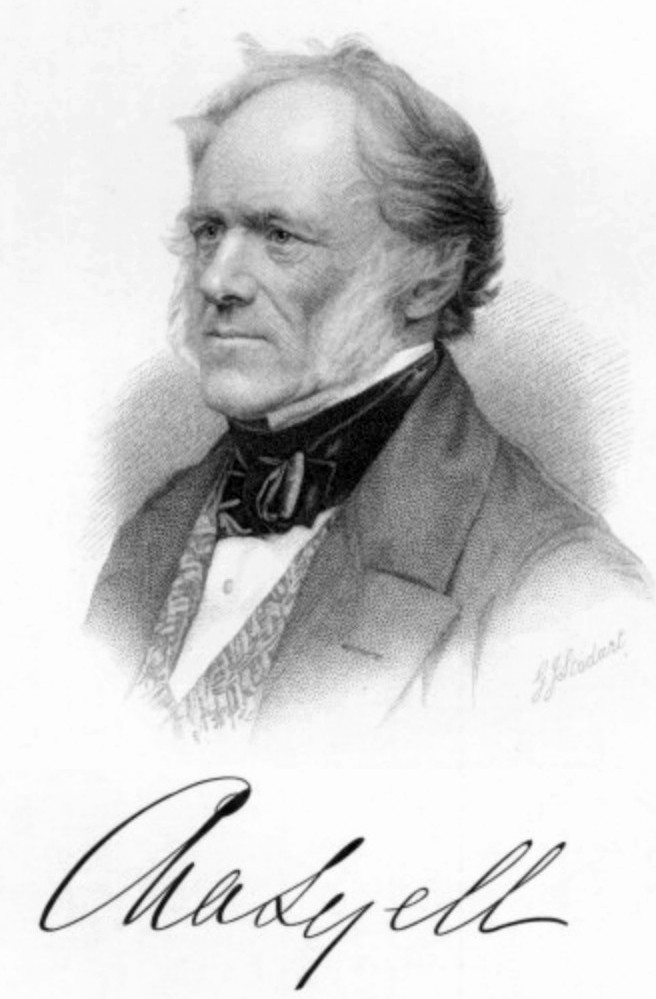
- Portrait of Lyell by George J. Stodart
- Born: 14 November 1797; Kinnordy House, Angus, Scotland
- Died: 22 February 1875 (aged 77); Harley Street, London, England
- Resting place: The Nave of Westminster Abbey
- Education: Exeter College, Oxford
- Known for: Uniformitarianism
- Spouse: Mary Horner Lyell
- Awards: Royal Medal (1834); Copley Medal (1858); Wollaston Medal (1866)
- Scientific career
- Fields: Geology
- Workplaces: King's College London

Sir Charles Lyell, 1st Baronet (14 November 1797 – 22 February 1875) was a Scottish geologist who demonstrated the power of known natural causes in explaining the earth's history. He is best known today for his association with Charles Darwin and as the author of Principles of Geology (1830–33), which presented to a wide public audience the idea that the earth was shaped by the same natural processes still in operation today, operating at similar intensities. The philosopher William Whewell dubbed this gradualistic view "uniformitarianism" and contrasted it with catastrophism, which had been championed by Georges Cuvier and was better accepted in Europe. The combination of evidence and eloquence in Principles convinced a wide range of readers of the significance of "deep time" for understanding the earth and environment.

Lyell's scientific contributions included a pioneering explanation of climate change, in which shifting boundaries between oceans and continents could be used to explain long-term variations in temperature and rainfall. Lyell also gave influential explanations of earthquakes and developed the theory of gradual "backed up-building" of volcanoes. In stratigraphy his division of the Tertiary period into the Pliocene, Miocene, and Eocene was highly influential. He incorrectly conjectured that icebergs were the impetus behind the transport of glacial erratics, and that silty loess deposits might have settled out of flood waters. His creation of a separate period for human history, entitled the 'Recent', is widely cited as providing the foundations for the modern discussion of the Anthropocene.

Building on the innovative work of James Hutton and his follower John Playfair, Lyell favoured an indefinitely long age for the earth, despite evidence suggesting an old but finite age. He was a close friend of Charles Darwin, and contributed significantly to Darwin's thinking on the processes involved in evolution. As Darwin wrote in On the Origin of Species, "He who can read Sir Charles Lyell's grand work on the Principles of Geology, which the future historian will recognise as having produced a revolution in natural science, yet does not admit how incomprehensibly vast have been the past periods of time, may at once close this volume." Lyell helped to arrange the simultaneous publication in 1858 of papers by Darwin and Alfred Russel Wallace on natural selection, despite his personal religious qualms about the theory. He later published evidence from geology of the time man had existed on the earth.

== Biography ==
Lyell was born into a wealthy family, on 14 November 1797, at the family's estate house, Kinnordy House, near Kirriemuir in Forfarshire. He was the eldest of ten children. Lyell's father, also named Charles Lyell, was noted as a translator and scholar of Dante. An accomplished botanist, it was he who first exposed his son to the study of nature. Lyell's grandfather, also Charles Lyell, had made the family fortune supplying the Royal Navy at Montrose, enabling him to buy Kinnordy House.

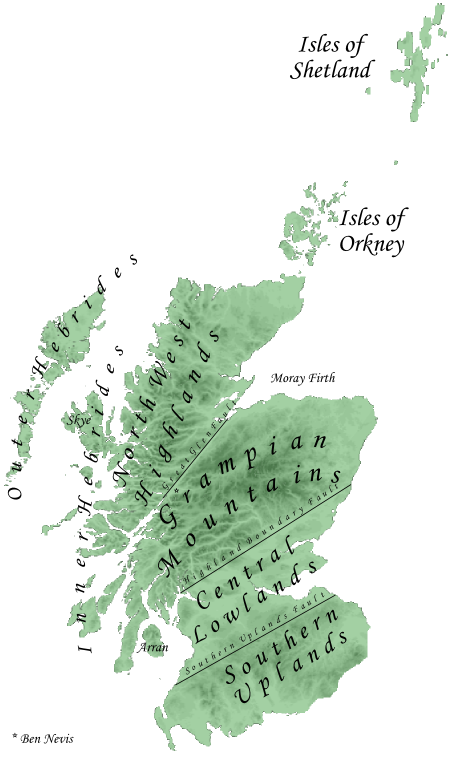
The main geographical divisions of Scotland

The family seat is located in Strathmore, near the Highland Boundary Fault. Round the house, in the strath, is good farmland, but within a short distance to the north-west, on the other side of the fault, are the Grampian Mountains in the Highlands. His family's second country home was in a completely different geological and ecological area: he spent much of his childhood at Bartley Lodge in the New Forest, in Hampshire in southern England.

Lyell entered Exeter College, Oxford, in 1816, and attended William Buckland's geological lectures. He graduated with a BA Hons. second class degree in classics, in December 1819, and gained his M.A. 1821. After graduation he took up law as a profession, entering Lincoln's Inn in 1820. He completed a circuit through rural England, where he could observe geological phenomena. In 1821 he attended Robert Jameson's lectures in Edinburgh, and visited Gideon Mantell at Lewes, in Sussex. In 1823 he was elected joint secretary of the Geological Society. As his eyesight began to deteriorate, he turned to geology as a full-time profession. His first paper, "On a recent formation of freshwater limestone in Forfarshire", was presented in 1826. By 1827, he had abandoned law and embarked on a geological career that would result in fame and the general acceptance of uniformitarianism, a working out of the ideas proposed by James Hutton a few decades earlier.

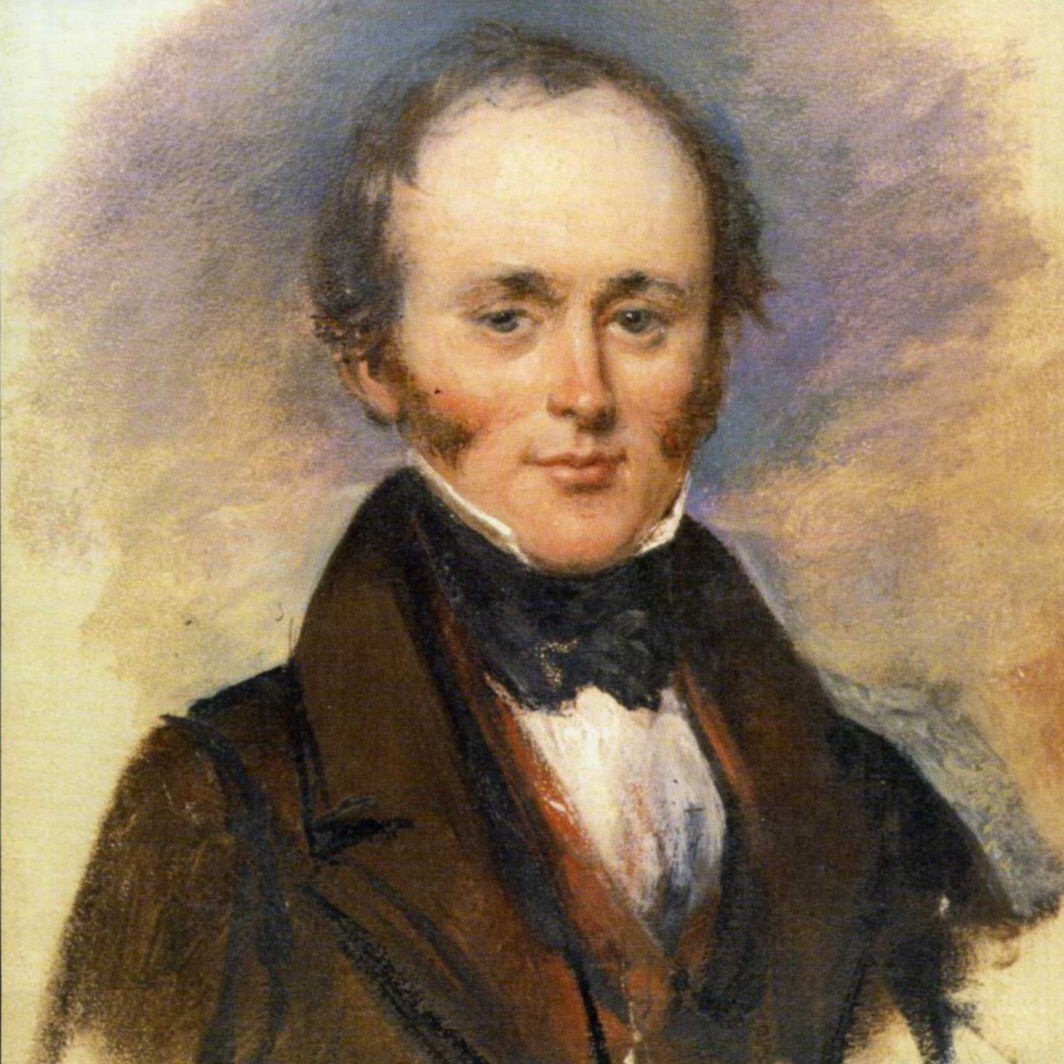
Charles Lyell at the British Association meeting in Glasgow 1840. Painting by Alexander Craig.

In 1832, Lyell married Mary Horner in Bonn, daughter of Leonard Horner (1785–1864), also associated with the Geological Society of London. The new couple spent their honeymoon in Switzerland and Italy on a geological tour of the area.

During the 1840s, Lyell travelled to the United States and Canada, and wrote two popular travel-and-geology books: Travels in North America (1845) and A Second Visit to the United States (1849). In 1866, he was elected a foreign member of the Royal Swedish Academy of Sciences. After the Great Chicago Fire in 1871, Lyell was one of the first to donate books to help found the Chicago Public Library.

In 1841, Lyell was elected as a member to the American Philosophical Society.

Lyell's wife died in 1873, and two years later (in 1875) Lyell himself died as he was revising the twelfth edition of Principles. He is buried in Westminster Abbey where there is a bust to him by William Theed in the north aisle.

Lyell was knighted (Kt) in 1848, and later, in 1864, made a baronet (Bt). He was awarded the Copley Medal of the Royal Society in 1858 and the Wollaston Medal of the Geological Society in 1866. Mount Lyell, the highest peak in Yosemite National Park, is named after him; the crater Lyell on the Moon and a crater on Mars were named in his honour; Mount Lyell in western Tasmania, Australia, located in a profitable mining area, bears Lyell's name; and the Lyell Range in north-west Western Australia is named after him as well. In Southwest Nelson in the South Island of New Zealand, the Lyell Range, Lyell River and the gold mining town of Lyell (now only a camping site) were all named after Lyell. Lyall Bay in Wellington, New Zealand was possibly named after Lyell. The jawless fish Cephalaspis lyelli, from the Old Red Sandstone of southern Scotland, was named by Louis Agassiz in honour of Lyell.

Sir Charles Lyell was buried at Westminster Abbey on 27 February 1875. The pallbearers included T. H. Huxley, the Rev. W. S. Symonds and Mr John Carrick Moore.

== Career and major writings ==
Lyell had private means, and earned further income as an author. He came from a prosperous family, worked briefly as a lawyer in the 1820s, and held the post of Professor of Geology at King's College London in the 1830s. From 1830 onward his books provided both income and fame. Each of his three major books was a work continually in progress. All three went through multiple editions during his lifetime, although many of his friends (such as Darwin) thought the first edition of the Principles was the best written. Lyell used each edition to incorporate additional material, rearrange existing material, and revisit old conclusions in light of new evidence.

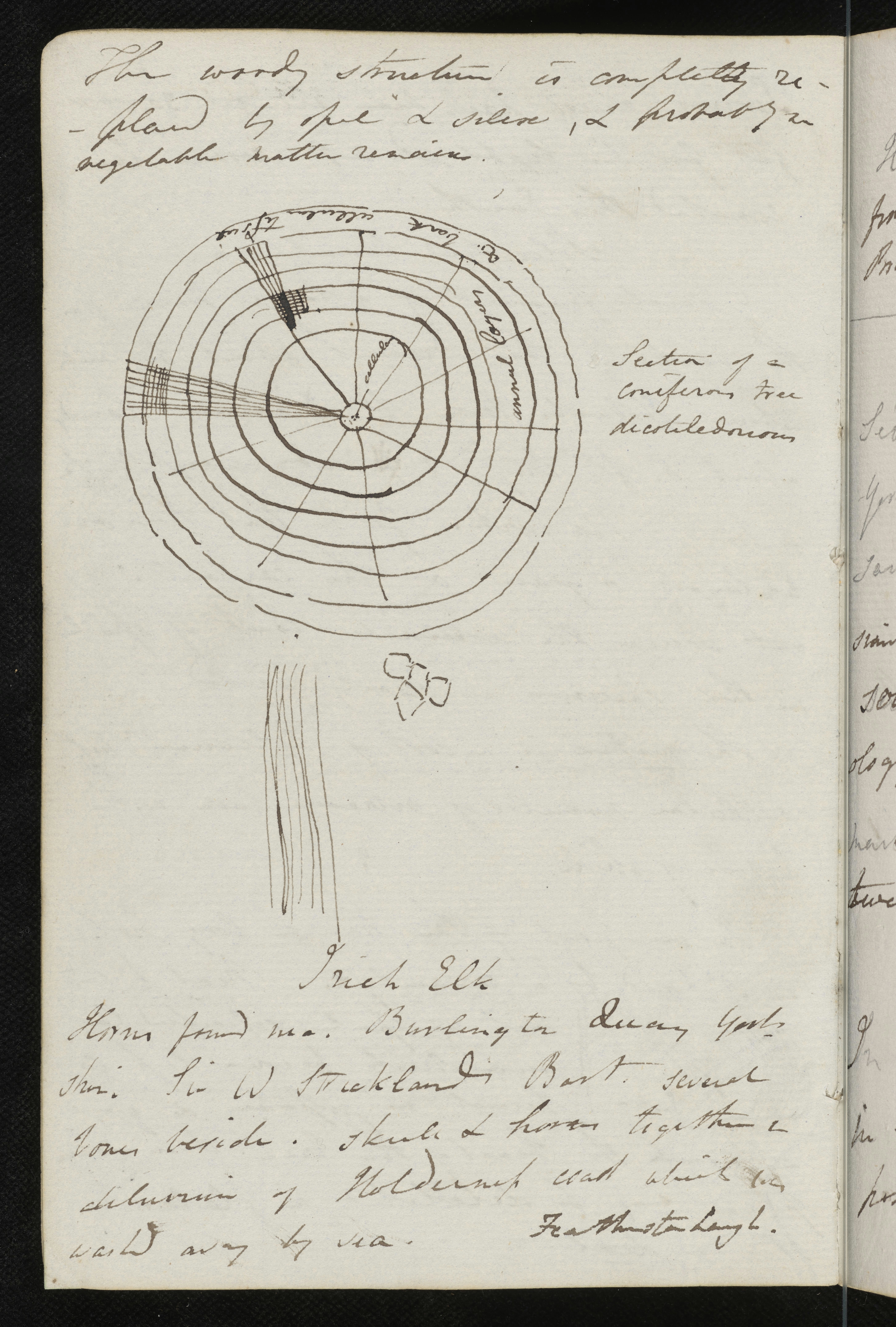
A page from one of Lyell's notebooks, held in the University of Edinburgh's Heritage Collections

Throughout his life, Lyell kept a remarkable series of nearly three hundred manuscript notebooks and diaries. These span Lyell's long scientific career (1825–1874), and offer an unrivalled insight into personal influences, field observations, thoughts and relationships. They were acquired in 2019 by the University of Edinburgh's Heritage Collections, thanks to a fundraising campaign, with many generous individual and institutional donors from the UK and overseas. Highlights include his travels throughout Europe and the United States of America, the drafts of his correspondence with the likes of Charles Darwin, his geological and landscape sketches and his constant gathering of evidence and refinement of his theories. Lyell's collection held at the University of Edinburgh, including digital images of his five series of notebooks, and with links to other Lyell material held elsewhere, is now available on a dedicated website.

Principles of Geology, Lyell's first book, was also his most famous, most influential, and most important. First published in three volumes in 1830–33, it established Lyell's credentials as an important geological theorist and propounded the doctrine of uniformitarianism. It was a work of synthesis, backed by his own personal observations on his travels.

The central argument in Principles was that the present is the key to the past – a concept of the Scottish Enlightenment which David Hume had stated as "all inferences from experience suppose ... that the future will resemble the past", and James Hutton had described when he wrote in 1788 that "from what has actually been, we have data for concluding with regard to that which is to happen thereafter." Geological remains from the distant past can, and should, be explained by reference to geological processes now in operation and thus directly observable. Lyell's interpretation of geological change as the steady accumulation of minute changes over enormously long spans of time was a powerful influence on the young Charles Darwin. Lyell asked Robert FitzRoy, captain of HMS Beagle, to search for erratic boulders on the survey voyage of the Beagle, and just before it set out FitzRoy gave Darwin Volume 1 of the first edition of Lyell's Principles. When the Beagle made its first stop ashore at St Jago in the Cape Verde islands, Darwin found rock formations which seen "through Lyell's eyes" gave him a revolutionary insight into the geological history of the island, an insight he applied throughout his travels.

While in South America Darwin received Volume 2 which considered the ideas of Jean-Baptiste Lamarck in some detail. Lyell rejected Lamarck's idea of organic evolution, proposing instead "Centres of Creation" to explain diversity and territory of species. However, as discussed below, many of his letters show he was fairly open to the idea of evolution. In geology Darwin was very much Lyell's disciple, and brought back observations and his own original theorising, including ideas about the formation of atolls, which supported Lyell's uniformitarianism. On the return of the Beagle (October 1836) Lyell invited Darwin to dinner and from then on they were close friends.

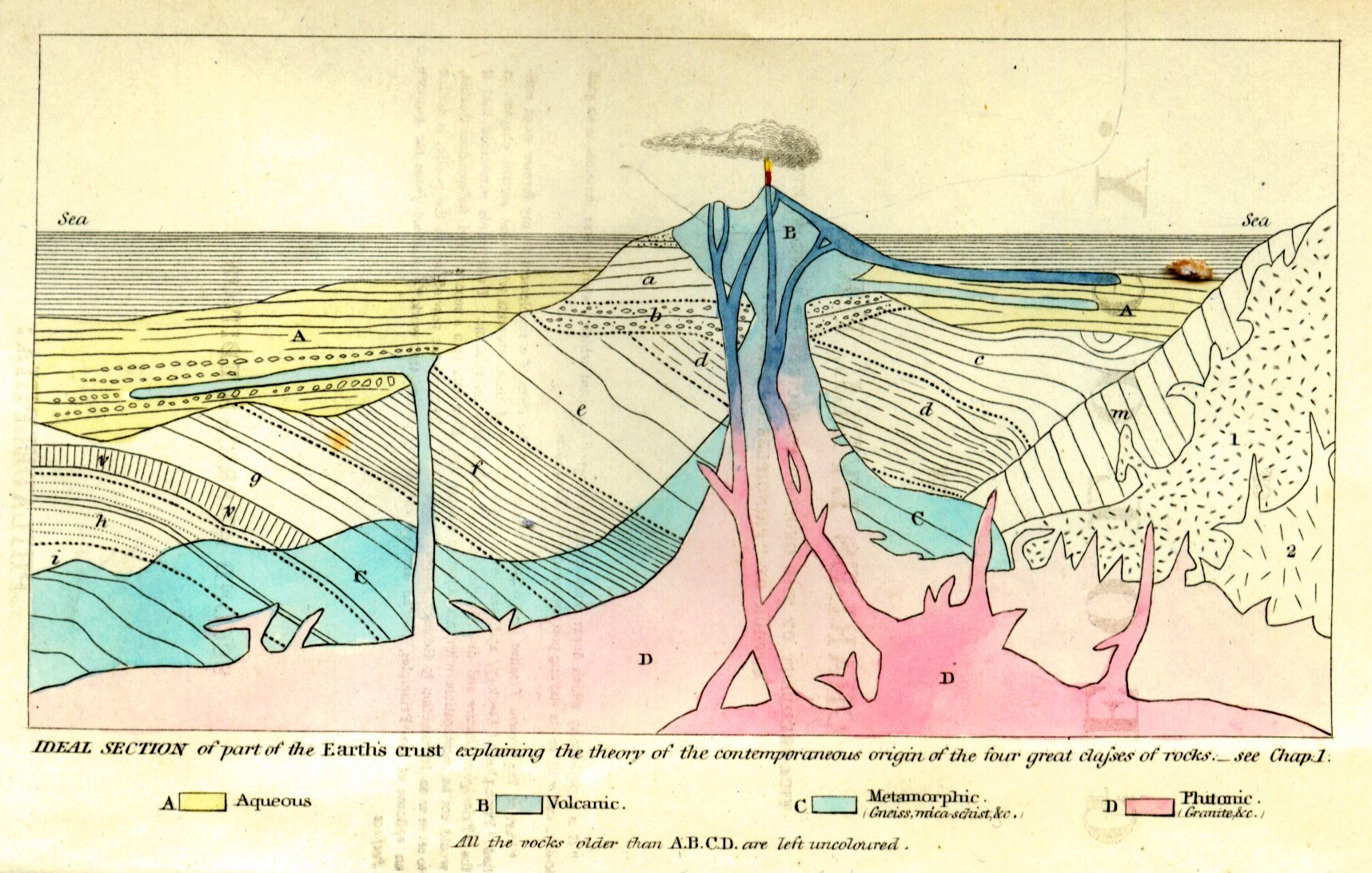
The frontispiece from Elements of Geology

Although Darwin discussed evolutionary ideas with him from 1842, Lyell continued to reject evolution in each of the first nine editions of the Principles. He encouraged Darwin to publish, and following the 1859 publication of On the Origin of Species, Lyell finally offered a tepid endorsement of evolution in the tenth edition of Principles.

Elements of Geology began as the fourth volume of the third edition of Principles: Lyell intended the book to act as a suitable field guide for students of geology. The systematic, factual description of geological formations of different ages contained in Principles grew so unwieldy, however, that Lyell split it off as the Elements in 1838. The book went through six editions, eventually growing to two volumes and ceasing to be the inexpensive, portable handbook that Lyell had originally envisioned. Late in his career, therefore, Lyell produced a condensed version titled Student's Elements of Geology that fulfilled the original purpose.

Geological Evidences of the Antiquity of Man brought together Lyell's views on three key themes from the geology of the Quaternary Period of earth history: glaciers, evolution, and the age of the human race. First published in 1863, it went through three editions that year, with a fourth and final edition appearing in 1873. The book was widely regarded as a disappointment because of Lyell's equivocal treatment of evolution. Lyell, a highly religious man with a strong belief in the special status of human reason, had great difficulty reconciling his beliefs with natural selection.

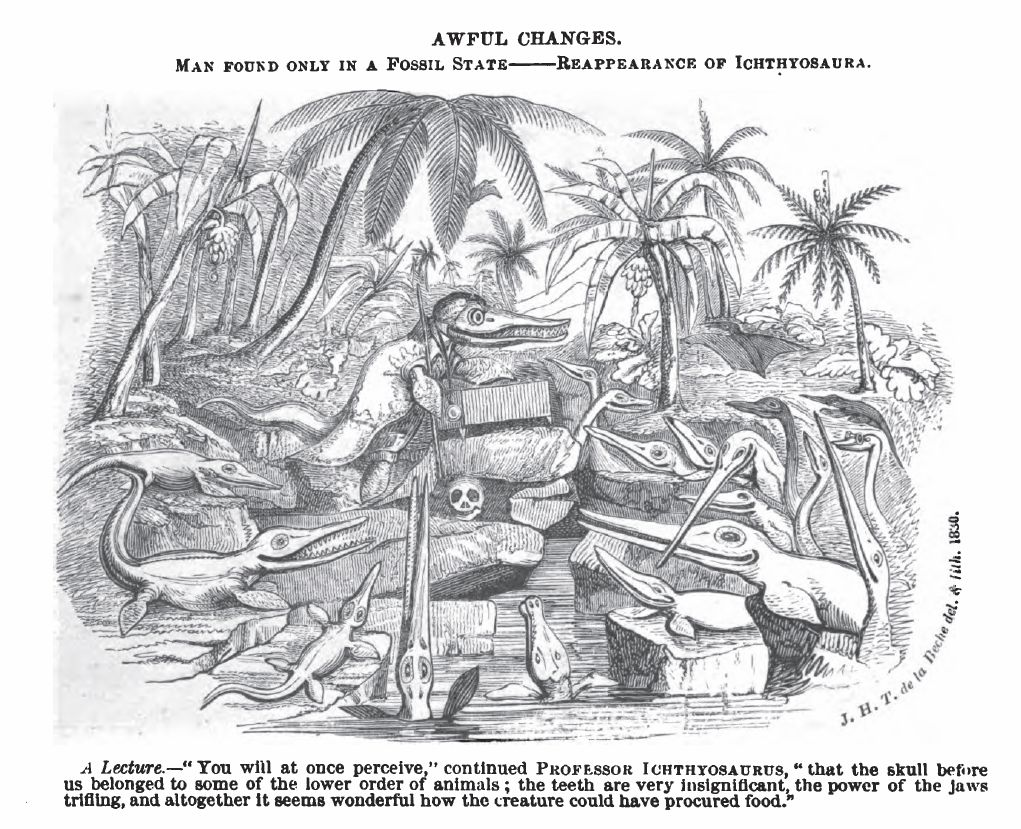
"Professor Ichthyosaurus" shows his pupils the skull of extinct man, caricature of Lyell by Henry De la Beche (1830)

== Scientific contributions ==
Lyell's geological interests ranged from volcanoes and geological dynamics through stratigraphy, palaeontology, and glaciology to topics that would now be classified as prehistoric archaeology and paleoanthropology. He is best known, however, for his role in elaborating the doctrine of uniformitarianism. He played a critical role in advancing the study of loess.

=== Uniformitarianism ===
From 1830 to 1833 his multi-volume Principles of Geology was published. The work's subtitle was "An attempt to explain the former changes of the earth's surface by reference to causes now in operation", and this explains Lyell's impact on science. He drew his explanations from field studies conducted directly before he went to work on the founding geology text. He was, along with the earlier John Playfair, the major advocate of James Hutton's idea of uniformitarianism, that the earth was shaped entirely by slow-moving forces still in operation today, acting over a very long time. This was in contrast to catastrophism, an idea of abrupt geological changes, which had been adapted in England to explain landscape features—such as rivers much smaller than their associated valleys—that seemed impossible to explain other than through violent action. Criticizing the reliance of his contemporaries on what he argued were ad hoc explanations, Lyell wrote,

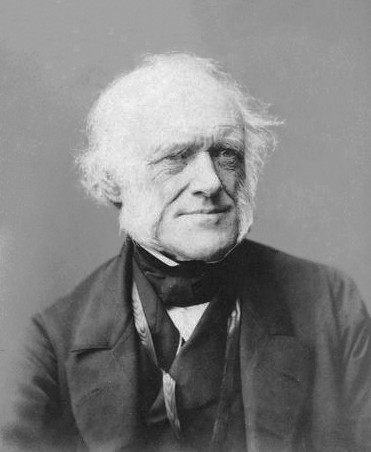
Lyell between 1865 and 1870

Never was there a doctrine more calculated to foster indolence, and to blunt the keen edge of curiosity, than this assumption of the discordance between the former and the existing causes of change... The student was taught to despond from the first. Geology, it was affirmed, could never arise to the rank of an exact science... [With catastrophism] we see the ancient spirit of speculation revived, and a desire manifestly shown to cut, rather than patiently untie, the Gordian Knot.-Sir Charles Lyell, Principles of Geology, 1854 edition, p. 196; quoted by Stephen Jay Gould.

Lyell saw himself as "the spiritual saviour of geology, freeing the science from the old dispensation of Moses." The two terms, uniformitarianism and catastrophism, were both coined by William Whewell; in 1866 R. Grove suggested the simpler term continuity for Lyell's view, but the old terms persisted. In various revised editions (12 in all, through 1872), Principles of Geology was the most influential geological work in the middle of the 19th century and did much to put geology on a modern footing.

=== Geological surveys ===
Lyell noted the "economic advantages" geological surveys could provide, citing their felicity in mineral-rich countries and provinces. Modern surveys, like the British Geological Survey (founded in 1835), and the US Geological Survey (founded in 1879), map and exhibit the natural resources within their countries. Over time, these surveys have been used extensively by modern extractive industries, such as nuclear, coal, and oil.

=== Volcanoes and geological dynamics ===
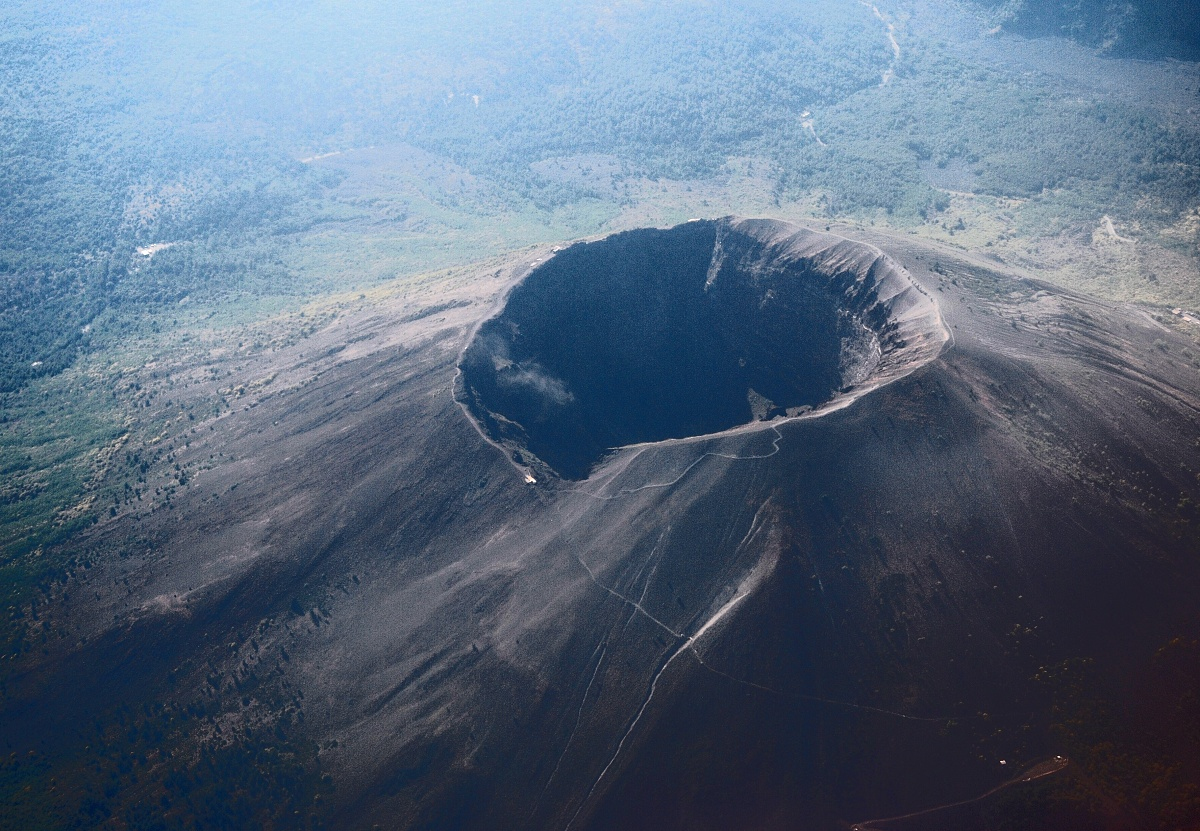
Lyell argued that volcanoes like Vesuvius had built up gradually.

Before Lyell's work, phenomena such as earthquakes were understood by the destruction that they brought. One of the contributions that Lyell made in Principles was to explain the cause of earthquakes. Lyell, in contrast, focused on more recent earthquakes (150 yrs), evidenced by surface irregularities such as faults, fissures, stratigraphic displacements and depressions.

Lyell's work on volcanoes focused largely on Vesuvius and Etna, both of which he had earlier studied. His conclusions supported gradual building of volcanoes, so-called "backed up-building", as opposed to the upheaval argument supported by other geologists.

=== Stratigraphy and human history ===
Lyell was a key figure in establishing the classification of more recent geological deposits, long known as the Tertiary period. From May 1828, until February 1829, he travelled with Roderick Impey Murchison (1792–1871) to the south of France (Auvergne volcanic district) and to Italy. In these areas he concluded that the recent strata (rock layers) could be categorised according to the number and proportion of marine shells encased within. Based on this the third volume of his Principles of Geology, published in 1833, proposed dividing the Tertiary period into four parts, which he named the Eocene, Miocene, Pliocene, and Recent. In 1839, Lyell termed the Pleistocene epoch, distinguishing a more recent fossil layer from the Pliocene. The Recent epoch – renamed the Holocene by French paleontologist Paul Gervais in 1867 – included all deposits from the era subject to human observation. In recent years Lyell's subdivisions have been widely discussed with debates about the Anthropocene.

=== Glaciers ===
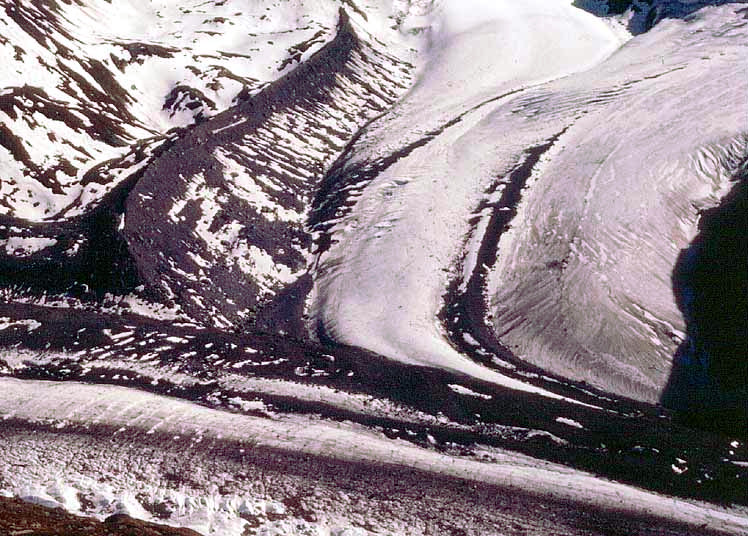
Lateral moraine on a glacier joining the Gorner Glacier, Zermatt, Switzerland.

In Principles of Geology (first edition, vol. 3, ch. 2, 1833) Lyell proposed that icebergs could be the means of transport for erratics. During periods of global warming, ice breaks off the poles and floats across submerged continents, carrying debris with it, he conjectured. When the iceberg melts, it rains down sediments upon the land. Because this theory could account for the presence of diluvium, the word drift became the preferred term for the loose, unsorted material, today called till. Furthermore, Lyell believed that the accumulation of fine angular particles covering much of the world (today called loess) was a deposit settled from mountain flood water. Today some of Lyell's mechanisms for geological processes have been disproven, though many have stood the test of time. His observational methods and general analytical framework remain in use today as foundational principles in geology.

=== Evolution ===
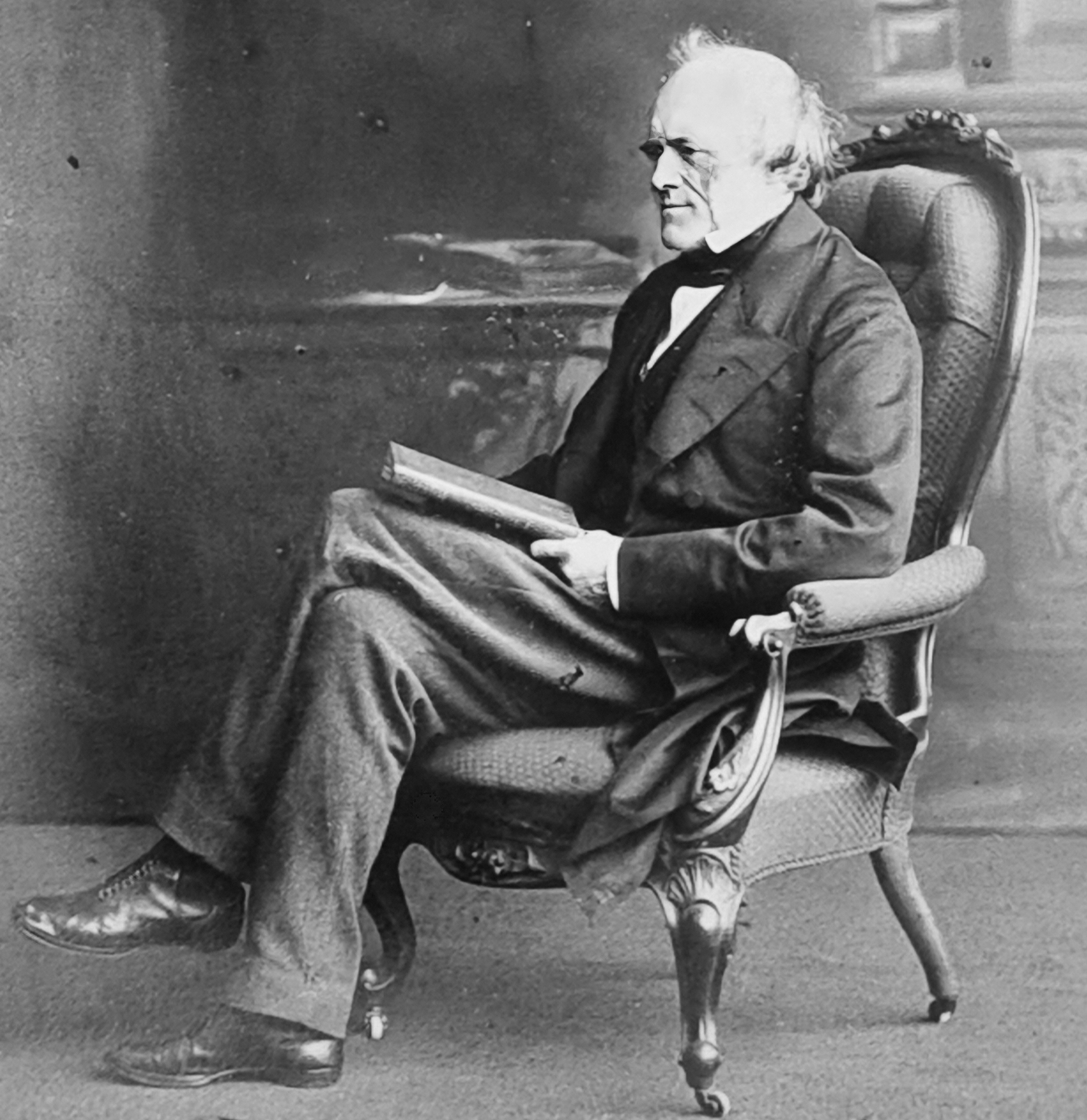
Portrait of Charles Lyell, Scottish geologist, c. 1863

Lyell initially accepted the conventional view of other men of science, that the fossil record indicated a directional geohistory in which species went extinct. Around 1826, when he was on circuit, he read Lamarck's Zoological Philosophy and on 2 March 1827 wrote to Mantell, expressing admiration, but cautioning that he read it "rather as I hear an advocate on the wrong side, to know what can be made of the case in good hands".:

I devoured Lamarck... his theories delighted me... I am glad that he has been courageous enough and logical enough to admit that his argument, if pushed as far as it must go, if worth anything, would prove that men may have come from the Ourang-Outang. But after all, what changes species may really undergo!... That the earth is quite as old as he supposes, has long been my creed...

He struggled with the implications for human dignity, and later in 1827 wrote private notes on Lamarck's ideas. Lyell reconciled transmutation of species with natural theology by suggesting that it would be as much a "remarkable manifestation of creative Power" as creating each species separately. He countered Lamarck's views by rejecting continued cooling of the earth in favour of "a fluctuating cycle", a long-term steady-state geohistory as proposed by James Hutton. The fragmentary fossil record already showed "a high class of fishes, close to reptiles" in the Carboniferous period which he called "the first Zoological era", and quadrupeds could also have existed then. In November 1827, after William Broderip found a Middle Jurassic fossil of the early mammal Didelphis, Lyell told his father that "There was everything but man even as far back as the Oolite." Lyell inaccurately portrayed Lamarckism as a response to the fossil record, and said it was falsified by a lack of progress. He said in the second volume of Principles that the occurrence of this one fossil of the higher mammalia "in these ancient strata, is as fatal to the theory of successive development, as if several hundreds had been discovered."

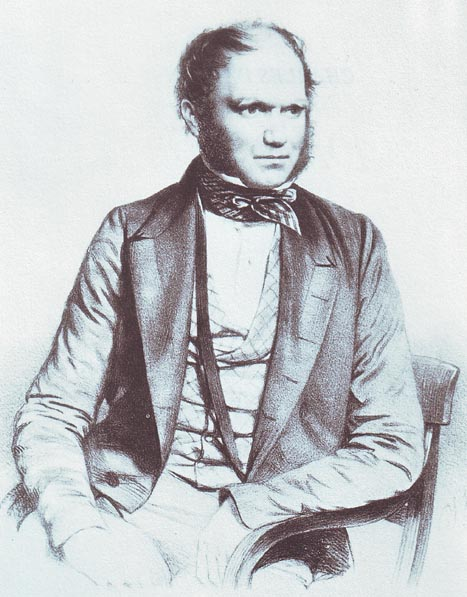
Charles Darwin

In the first edition of Principles, the first volume briefly set out Lyell's concept of a steady state with no real progression of fossils. The sole exception was the advent of humanity, with no great physical distinction from animals, but with absolutely unique intellectual and moral qualities. The second volume dismissed Lamarck's claims of animal forms arising from habits, continuous spontaneous generation of new life, and man having evolved from lower forms. Lyell explicitly rejected Lamarck's concept of transmutation of species, drawing on Cuvier's arguments, and concluded that species had been created with stable attributes. He discussed the geographical distribution of plants and animals, and proposed that every species of plant or animal was descended from a pair or individual, originated in response to differing external conditions. Species would regularly go extinct, in a "struggle for existence" between hybrids, or a "war one with another" due to population pressure. He was vague about how replacement species formed, portraying this as an infrequent occurrence which could rarely be observed.

The leading man of science Sir John Herschel wrote from Cape Town on 20 February 1836, thanking Lyell for sending a copy of Principles and praising the book as opening a way for bold speculation on "that mystery of mysteries, the replacement of extinct species by others" – by analogy with other intermediate causes, "the origination of fresh species, could it ever come under our cognizance, would be found to be a natural in contradistinction to a miraculous process". Lyell replied: "In regard to the origination of new species, I am very glad to find that you think it probable that it may be carried on through the intervention of intermediate causes. I left this rather to be inferred, not thinking it worth while to offend a certain class of persons by embodying in words what would only be a speculation." Whewell subsequently questioned this topic, and in March 1837 Lyell told him:

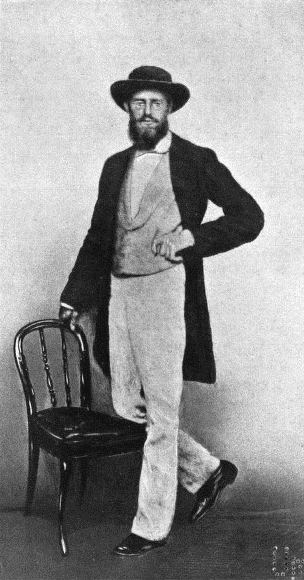
Alfred Russel Wallace in 1862

If I had stated... the possibility of the introduction or origination of fresh species being a natural, in contradistinction to a miraculous process, I should have raised a host of prejudices against me, which are unfortunately opposed at every step to any philosopher who attempts to address the public on these mysterious subjects ...

As a result of his letters and, no doubt, personal conversations, Huxley and Ernst Haeckel were convinced that, at the time he wrote Principles, he believed new species had arisen by natural methods. Adam Sedgwick wrote worried letters to him about this.

By the time Darwin returned from the Beagle survey expedition in 1836, he had begun to doubt Lyell's ideas about the permanence of species. He continued to be a close personal friend, and Lyell was one of the first scientists to support On the Origin of Species, though he did not subscribe to all its contents. Lyell was also a friend of Darwin's closest colleagues, Joseph Dalton Hooker and Huxley, but unlike them he struggled to square his religious beliefs with evolution. This inner struggle has been much commented on. He had particular difficulty in believing in natural selection as the main motive force in evolution.

Lyell and Hooker were instrumental in arranging the peaceful co-publication of the theory of natural selection by Darwin and Alfred Russel Wallace in 1858: each had arrived at the theory independently. Lyell's views on gradual change and the power of a long time scale were important because Darwin thought that populations of an organism changed very slowly.

Although Lyell rejected evolution at the time of writing the Principles, after the Darwin–Wallace papers and the Origin Lyell wrote in one of his notebooks on 3 May 1860:

Mr. Darwin has written a work which will constitute an era in geology & natural history to show that... the descendants of common parents may become in the course of ages so unlike each other as to be entitled to rank as a distinct species, from each other or from some of their progenitors ...

Lyell's acceptance of natural selection, Darwin's proposed mechanism for evolution, was equivocal, and came in the tenth edition of Principles. The Antiquity of Man (published in early February 1863, just before Huxley's Evidence as to Man's Place in Nature) drew these comments from Darwin to Huxley: "I am fearfully disappointed at Lyell's excessive caution" and "The book is a mere 'digest'".

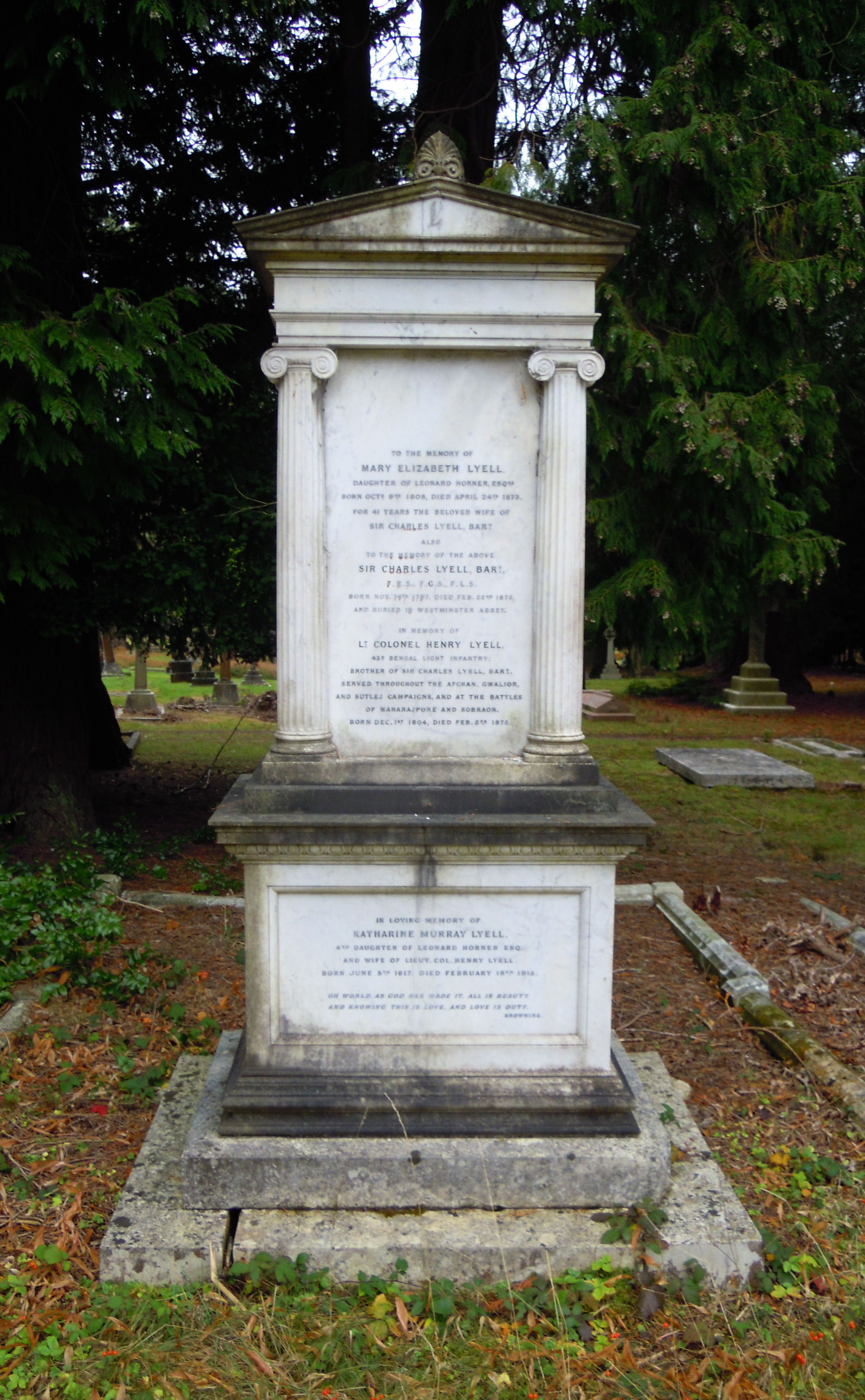
Lyell Family Grave in Brookwood Cemetery with a memorial to Lyell

Quite strong remarks: no doubt Darwin resented Lyell's repeated suggestion that he owed a lot to Lamarck, whom he (Darwin) had always specifically rejected. Darwin's daughter Henrietta (Etty) wrote to her father: "Is it fair that Lyell always calls your theory a modification of Lamarck's?"

In other respects Antiquity was a success. It sold well, and it "shattered the tacit agreement that mankind should be the sole preserve of theologians and historians". But when Lyell wrote that it remained a profound mystery how the huge gulf between man and beast could be bridged, Darwin wrote "Oh!" in the margin of his copy.

== Legacy ==
Places named after Lyell:

- Lyell, New Zealand
- Lyell Butte, in the Grand Canyon
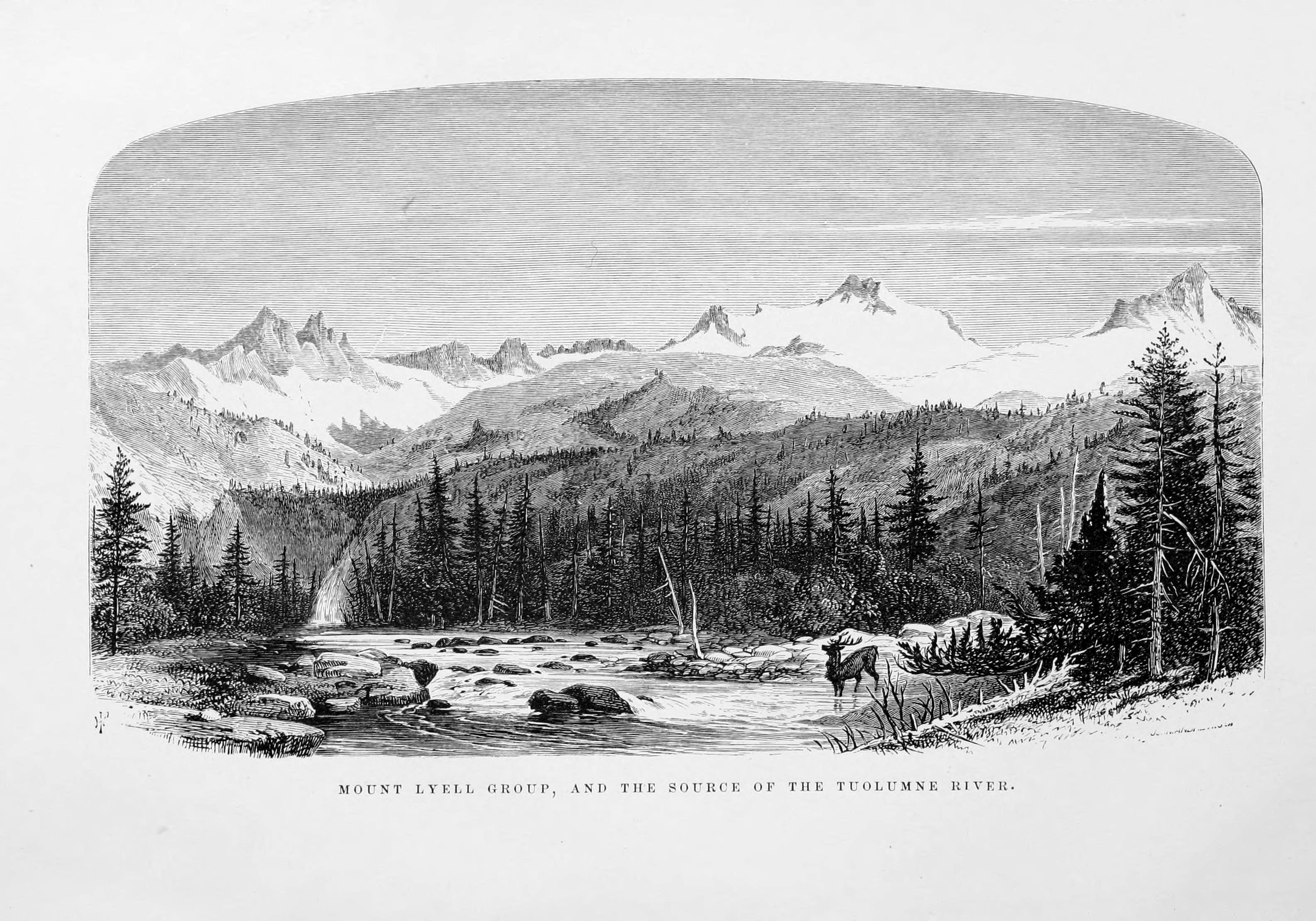
  California's Mount Lyell group
- Lyell Canyon in Yosemite National Park
- Lyell Fork, one of two large forks of the Tuolumne River
- Lyell Land (Greenland)
- Lyell Glacier
- Lyell Glacier, South Georgia
- Mount Lyell (California)
- Mount Lyell (Canada)
- Mount Lyell (Tasmania)
- Lyell Avenue (Rochester, NY)

== Bibliography ==
All the books except the Broadway Lectures were published by London, John Murray, Albemarle-Street.

=== Geology ===
==== Books ====
- Principles of Geology: Being an Attempt to Explain the Former Changes of the Earth's Surface, by Reference to Causes Now in Operation (12 editions) (1830–75)
1. 1st edition, 2 volumes: volume 1 (January 1830), volume 2 (January 1832)
2. 2nd edition, 3 volumes: volume 1 (1832), volume 2 (January 1833), volume 3 (May 1833)
3. 3rd edition, 4 volumes (May 1834) 1 2 3 4
4. 4th edition, 4 volumes (June 1835) 1 2 3 4
5. 5th edition, 4 volumes (March 1837) 1 2 3 4 (Charles Darwin's copy)
6. 6th edition, 3 volumes (June 1840) 1 2 3
7. 7th edition (February 1847)
8. 8th edition (May 1850)
9. 9th edition (June 1853)
10. 10th edition, 2 volumes volume 1 (1867) volume 2 (1868)
11. 11th edition, 2 volumes (1872) 1 2
12. 12th edition, 2 volumes (1875) - posthumous 1 2
- Elements of Geology (A Manual of Elementary Geology - The Ancient Changes of the Earth and its Inhabitants as Illustrated by Geological Monuments) (9 editions) (1838–74)
1. 1st edition (July 1838)
2. 2nd edition, 2 volumes (July 1841) - 1 2
3. 3rd edition (January 1851)
4. 4th edition (January 1852)
5. 5th edition (1855) (Charles Darwin's copy) and Supplement (1857):
  1. 1st edition
  2. revised 2nd edition
6. 6th edition (1865)
7. Students' 1st edition (1871)
8. Students' 2nd revised and corrected edition (1874)
9. Students' 3rd revised and corrected edition (1878) - posthumously edited by Leonard Lyell and Professor John Wesley Judd
- 8 Lectures on Geology Delivered at the Broadway Tabernacle (2 Editions) (1842-3):
1. 1st edition (1842)
2. 2nd edition (1843)
- Travels in North America in the years 1841-2 with geological observations on the United States, Canada, and Nova Scotia (2 Volumes) (2 editions) (1845 and 1855)
1. 1st edition (1845) 1, 2
2. 2nd edition (1855) 1 2
- A Second Visit to the United States of North America (2 Volumes) (3 editions) (1849–55)
1. 1st edition (1849) 1 2
2. 2nd edition (1850) 1 2
3. 3rd edition (1855) 1 2
- Scientific Journal on the Species Question (1855–61) (2 Editions):
1. 1st edition (1862)
2. 2nd edition (posthumous) - edited and annotated with a preface and introduction by Leonard G. Wilson (1970)

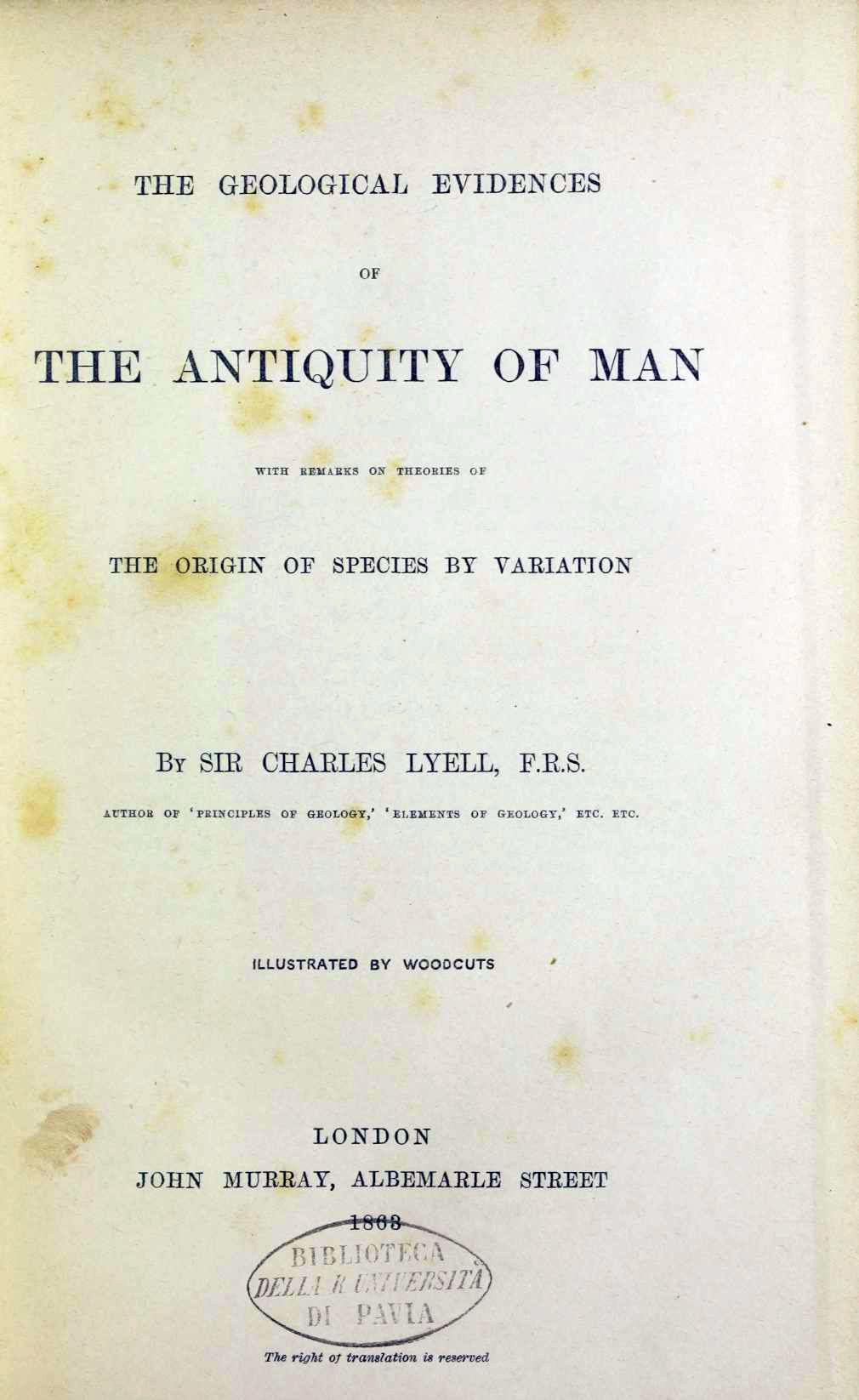
Geological evidences of the antiquity of man, 1863

- Geological Evidences of the Antiquity of Man with Remarks on Theories of the Origin of Species by Variation (4 editions) (1863 and 1873)
1. 1st edition (February 1863)
2. 2nd edition (April 1863)
3. 3rd edition (November 1863)
4. 4th edition (May 1873)

==== Papers and Lectures ====
- On a recent Formation of Freshwater Limestone in Forfarshire and on some recent Deposits of Freshwater Marl/ Geological Society's Transactions 1825.
- On Serpentine Dyke in Forfarshire Edinburgh Journal of Science, 1825.
- On Various Scientific Institutions in England,’ Quarterly Review, 1825.
- “Art. VIII. 1. Transactions of the Cambridge Philosophical Society. vol. 1. 2. Memoirs of the Literary and Philosophical Society of Manchester. 2nd Series, vol. iv. London, 1824. 3. Transactions of the Royal Geological Society of Cornwall, instituted February 11, vol. i and ii. Penzance. 4. Report of the Liverpool Royal Institution. 1822. 5. Bristol Institution. Proceedings of the Second Annual Meeting held February 10, 1825 etc. 6. Annual Report of the Council of the Yorkshire Philosophical Society for 1824,” Quart. Rev. 34 (1826): 153-79.
- “Art. IX. Transactions of the Geological Society of London vol. i. 2d Series. London 1824,” Quart. Rev. 34 (1826): 507-40.
- “Art. X. Letter to Mr. Brougham on the Subject of a London University, together with Suggestions respecting the Plan. By T. Campbell Esq., London, 1825,” Quart. Rev. 33 (1825–26): 257-75.
- On Fossil Bones of the Elephant and other Animals found near Salisbury ’ Geological Society's Proceedings, 1826.
- On the Strata of the Plastic Clay Formation between Christchurch Hants, and Studland Bay, Dorset,’ Geological Society's Transactions 1826
- On the Freshwater Strata of Hordwell Cliff, Beacon Cliff, and Barton Clift, Hampshire,’ Geological Society's Transactions, 1826.
- Review of Scrope’s ‘Geology of Central France,’ Quarterly Review, 1826.
- “Art. VIII. ‘State of the Universities ” Quart. Rev. 36 (1827): 216-68. V “Art. IV. Memoir on the Geology of Central France; including the Volcanic Formations of Auvergne, the Velay and the Vivarais, with a volume of Maps and Plates. By G. P. Scrope F.R.S., F.G.S., London 1827.” Quart. Rev. 36 (1827): 437-83.
- Roderick Impey Murchison on Excavation of Valleys,’ Edinburgh New Philosophical Journal, 1829.
- Roderick Impey Murchison on Lacustrine Deposits of Cantal,’ Annales des Sciences Naturelles, 1829. (Sur les depots lacustres tertiaires du Cantal, et leurs rapports avec les roches primordiales et volcaniques,” Ann. Sci. Arat. 18 (1829): 173-214; in French)
- Roderick Impey Murchison on Freshwater Formation of Aix in Provence,’ Edinburgh Philosophical Journal, 1829.
- Reply to a Note in the Rev. Mr. Conybeare’s paper entitled ‘An examination of those phaenomena of geology which seem to bear most directly on theoretical speculations/ ” Phil. Mag. 9 (1831): 1-3.
- On Freshwater Formation of Cerdagne in the Pyrenees,’ Magazine of Natural History, 1834.
- On the Proofs of a gradual Rising of the Land in certain Parts of Sweden, The Bakerian Lecture,’ Philosophical Transactions, 1834.
- On the Change of Level of the Land and Sea in Scandinavia,’ British Association Report, 1834.
- On Relative Ages of Crag in Norfolk and Suffolk,’ Magazine of Natural History, 1835,
- On the Cretaceous and Tertiary Strata of the Danish Islands of Seeland and Moen,’ 1835.
- On the Occurrence of Fossil Vertebras of Fish of the Shark Family in Loess of the Rhine,’ Geological Proceedings, 1835.
- Address to the Geological Society, delivered at the Anniversary on the 19th of February 1836,” Proceedings Geological Society London 2 (1834-37): 357 90.
- Address to the Geological Society, delivered at the Anniversary, on the 17th of February, 1837,” Proceedings Geological Society London 2 (1834–37): 479- 523.
- On Phenomena connected with the Junction of Granitic and Transition Rocks near Christiania in Norway,’ British Association Report, 1837
- On Vertical Lines of Flint, traversing Horizontal Strata of Chalk near Norwich,’ British Association Report, 1838
- On the Occurrence of Graptolites in the Slate of Galloway,’ Geological Proceedings, 1838.
- Remarks on Captain Bayfield's Canada Shells,’ Geological Transactions, 1839.
- On Remains of Mammalia in the Crag and London Clay of Suffolk,’ British Association Report, 1839.
- On Sandpipes in Chalk near Norwich,’ Philosophical Magazine, 1839.
- On Fossil Teeth of Leopard, Bear, &c. at Newbourn, Suffolk,’ Annals of Natural History, 1839.
- On Fossil Quadrumana, Marsupials, &c., in London Olay, near Woodbridge, Suffolk,’ Annals of Natural History IV., 1839.
- On Ancient Sea-cliffs in the Valley of the Seine in Normandy,’ British Association Report, 1840.
- On the Boulder Formation and Mud Cliffs of Eastern Norfolk,’ Geological Magazine, 1840.
- On the Geological Evidence of the former Existence of Glaciers in Forfarshire,’ Geological Proceedings, 1840.
- On the Genus Conus in the Lias of Normandy,’ Annals of Natural History VI., 1840.
- On the Faluns of the Loire,’ Geological Society's Proceedings, 1841.
- On the Freshwater Fossil Fishes of Mundesley as determined by Agassiz,’ Geological Society's Proceedings, 1841.
- Remarks on the Silurian Strata between Aymestry and Wenlock,’ Geological Society's Proceedings, 1841.
- Notes on the Silurian Strata near Christiania in Norway,’ Geological Proceedings, 1841.
- On the Carboniferous and Older Rocks of Pennsylvania,’ 1841.
- On the Recession of the Falls of Niagara,’ Geological Society's Proceedings, 1842.
- On the Elevated Beaches and Boulder Formations of the Canadian Lakes and Valley of St. Lawrence,’ Geological Society's Proceedings, 1842.
- On Fossil Footprints of Birds, Connecticut,’ Geological Society's Proceedings, 1842
- On the Tertiary Formations in Virginia, 1842.
- On Tertiary Strata of Martha's Vineyard, Geological Society's Proceedings, 1843.
- On Mastodon at Big-bone-Lick, Kentucky,’ Geological Society's Proceedings, 1848
- On Coal and Gypsum of Nova Scotia,’ Geological Society's Proceedings, 1843,
- On Loess of the Rhine,’ Edinburgh Philosophical Journal, 1843.
- On Chalk of New Jersey,’ Geological Journal, 1844.
- On Age of Plumbago and Anthracite at Worcester, Massachusetts," 1844
- Report on Haswell Colliery, Lyell and Faraday,’ Geological Journal, 1844
- On Miocene Strata of Maryland, Virginia,’ &c. 1845
- On White Limestone, and Eocene Formation in Virginia, Carolina, &c., Geological Journal, 1845,
- On Lava-currents, Auvergne,’ Geological Journal, 1845.
- On Goal-Field of Tuscaloosa, Alabama,’ Silliman’s Journal, 1846 ‘ On Alabama Coal-fields,’ Geological Journal, 1846.
- On Newer Deposits of Southern States, Claiborne,’ Geological Journal, 1846
- On Fossil Footprints, allied to Cheirotherium, in Pennsylvania,’ Geological Journal, 1846.
- On Delta of Mississippi,’ Lecture to the British Association, 1846.
- Age of Volcanoes in Auvergne, as determined by Fossil Mammalia,’ Lecture at Royal Institution, 1847.
- On Structure and Probable Age of Coal-field of James River, Virginia ’ Geological Society, 1847.
- On Craters of Denudation with Observations on the Structure and Growth of "Volcanic Cones,’ Geological Society's Proceedings, 1849.
- On Recent Foot-prints on Red Mud in Nova Scotia,’ Geological Journal, 1849.
- Lecture on Delta of Mississippi at the Royal Institution,’ 1849.
- On Forests of Erect Fossil Trees in Coal Strata of North America,’ Lecture at Royal Institution, 1850.
- President’s Address to Geological Society of London,’ 1850-1
- On Impressions of Raindrops in Ancient and Modern Strata,’ Lecture at Royal Institution, 1851
- On Fossil Rain-marks of the Recent Triassic and Carboniferous Periods,’ Geological Quarterly Journal, 1851.
- On Blacklieath Pebble-bed, and on Certain Phenomena in the Geology of the Neighbourhood of London,’ Royal Institution's Proceedings, 1851
- On Tertiary Strata of Belgium and French Flanders,’ Geological Journal, 1852
- On Remains of Dendrerpeton and Land Shells in Nova Scotia, by Sir C. Lyell and J. W. Dawson, with Notes by Wyman,’ Quarterly Geological Journal, 1853.
- On Geology of Madeira,’ Quarterly Geological Journal, 1853.
- On Erratic Blocks West of Massachusetts,’ Royal Institution Lecture, 1855.
- On Successive Changes in Temple of Serapis,’ Royal Institution Lecture, 1856.
- On Stony Lava on Steep Slopes on Etna,’ Royal Society's Proceedings, 1858.
- On Consolidation of Lava and on Volcanoes,’ Royal Institution Lecture, 1859.

=== biographical works ===
- The Life, Letters and Journals (2 Volumes) (1881) - posthumously edited by Katharine Murray Lyell 1 2
- Memoir of Leonard Horner, FRS, FGS, consisting of letters to his family and from some of his friends. (2 volumes) Women’s Printing Society (1890) - edited by Katharine Murray Lyell 1 - Limited Preview only 2 - contains letters to and from Lyell

== Notes ==
Baronetage of the United Kingdom
New creation	Baronet (of Kinnordy); 1864–1875	Extinct
