= Ramona Lubo =

Cahuilla basketmaker (1865–1922)

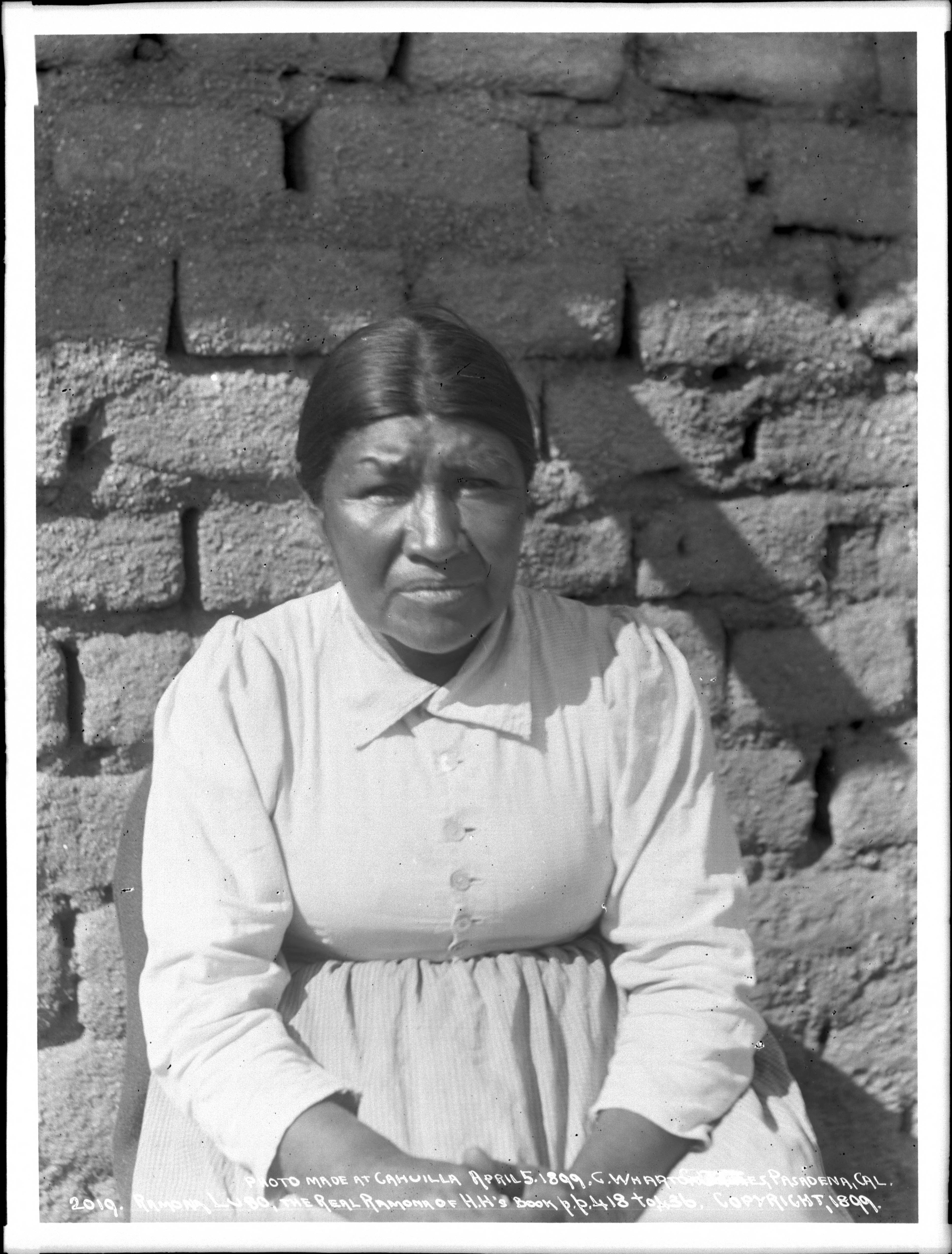
- Ramona Lubo, 1899
- Born: 1865
- Died: July 20, 1922 (aged 56–57)
- Resting place: Cahuilla Indian Reservation
- Citizenship: Cahuilla
- Occupation: basketmaker
- Children: 3

Ramona Lubo (1865–1922) was a Cahuilla basketmaker known as the "real Ramona" who gained popularity from her association with the novel Ramona by Helen Hunt Jackson.

== Life and career ==
Lubo married a Cahuilla sheep-shearer named Juan Diego, and they lived in the area west of Bautista Canyon in California, which is known today as Juan Diego Flats. They had two children who died when they were young. Diego was mentally ill, and, at times, observed to act erratically. In March 1883, Diego took the horse of a white man named Sam Temple in order to ride home from San Jacinto. Temple pursued Diego and shot him 5 times, with Lubo as an eyewitness. Temple reported the death to local Judge Samuel Tripp, claiming that it was self-defense and that Diego had a knife. Lubo stated that he did not have a knife but she was not permitted to testify at the trial because she was Native. California's Act Concerning Civil Cases prohibited Blacks and Native Americans from testifying in cases involving whites and was not officially repealed until 1955. Temple was acquitted on grounds of "justifiable homicide".

After Diego's killing, Lubo moved to the Cahuilla Indian Reservation near Anza and later had a son named Condino with a white man named Hopkins. She made baskets for holding water and threshing grain. For the Cahuilla and other California tribes, baskets were useful for preparing and storing food, were given as gifts to strengthen kinship ties, and were also an art form. Baskets had symbolic meaning, representing Native people's relationship with the land, and were a form of self-expression, with each weaver having a distinct style. George Wharton James showed one of Lubo's baskets at a lecture on "Poetry and the Symbolism of Indian Basketry" in October 1903. Lubo earned money from selling the baskets she made, washing clothes, and harvesting apricots.

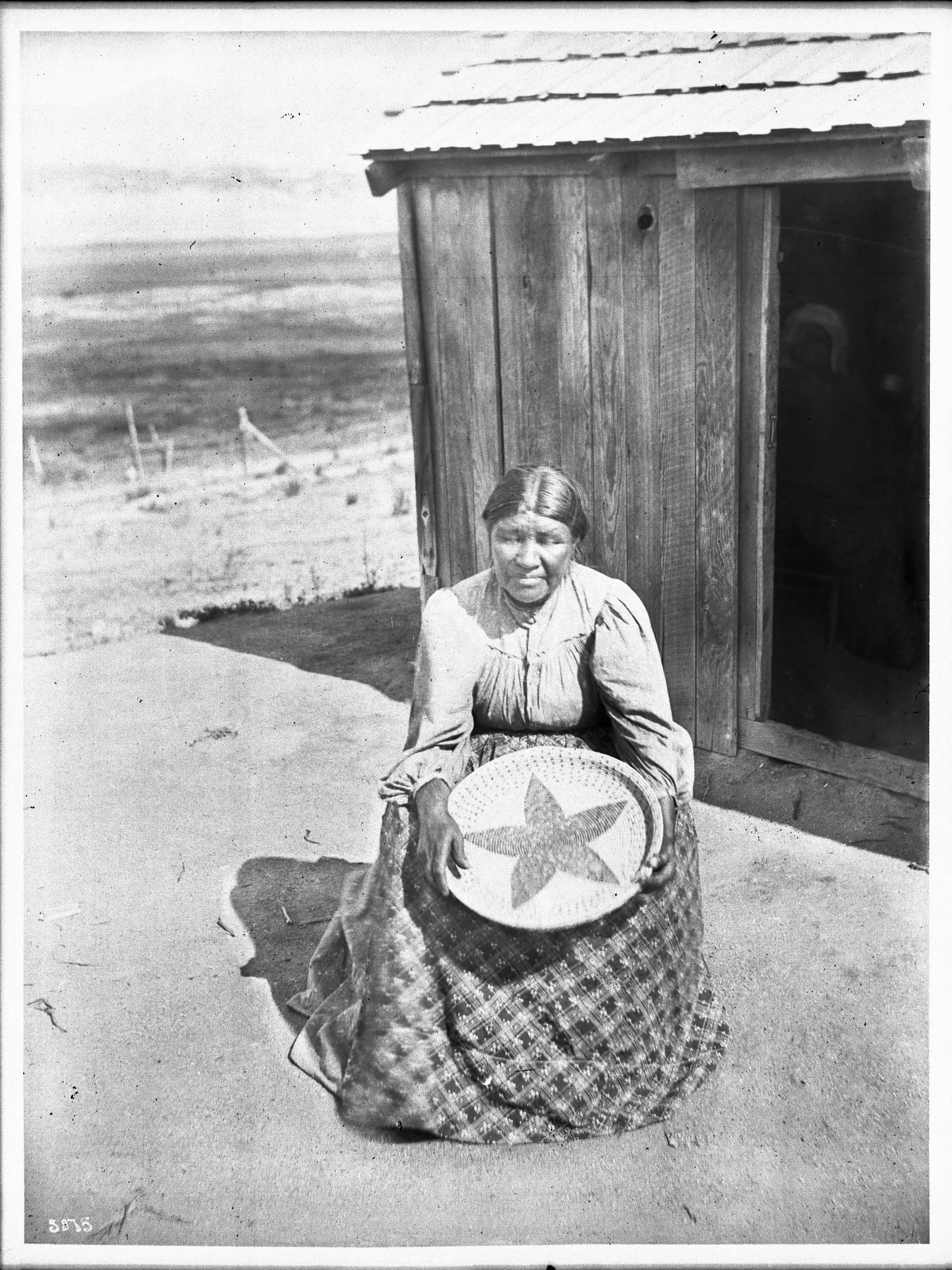
Lubo in front of her home with the star basket she made in memory of her husband, Juan Diego

== Novel and its effects ==
Helen Hunt Jackson based her novel Ramona (1884) on newspaper accounts of Juan Diego's death. The novel is a romanticized story about a Native man named Alessandro who is murdered in front of his wife Ramona after they are forced from their homes by white settlers. During her research Jackson visited many reservations in the area but never met Lubo, only finding out once the novel was half-written that Diego's wife coincidentally had the same name as her heroine. The novel was meant to bring attention to the injustice that Native people experienced, specifically the ways that whites had mistreated the California Mission Native Americans, however, the Cahuilla tribe that Lubo and Diego belonged to was never fully missionized. Nearby tribes were forced to live and work at Franciscan missions, but the Cahuilla were on the edges of the San Luis Rey and San Gabriel missions' area of influence so some but not all of their members were forced into the missions.

Jackson believed that a novel would be more likely to capture people's attention than a work of nonfiction, stating in a letter to her friends in Los Angeles written on November 8, 1883, "I am going to write a novel, in which will be set forth some Indian experiences in a way to move people's hearts." However, this vision was not realized since Jackson died of cancer shortly after Ramona was published and the novel ended up serving more to contribute to a romanticized view of California than it did to draw attention to the experience of Native peoples. The novel was extremely popular and brought many tourists to the area, including Rancho Camulos, a private residence that an 1886 article identified as the setting of the novel, and the Estudillo abode, which the San Diego Union named "Ramona's Marriage Place" in 1887.

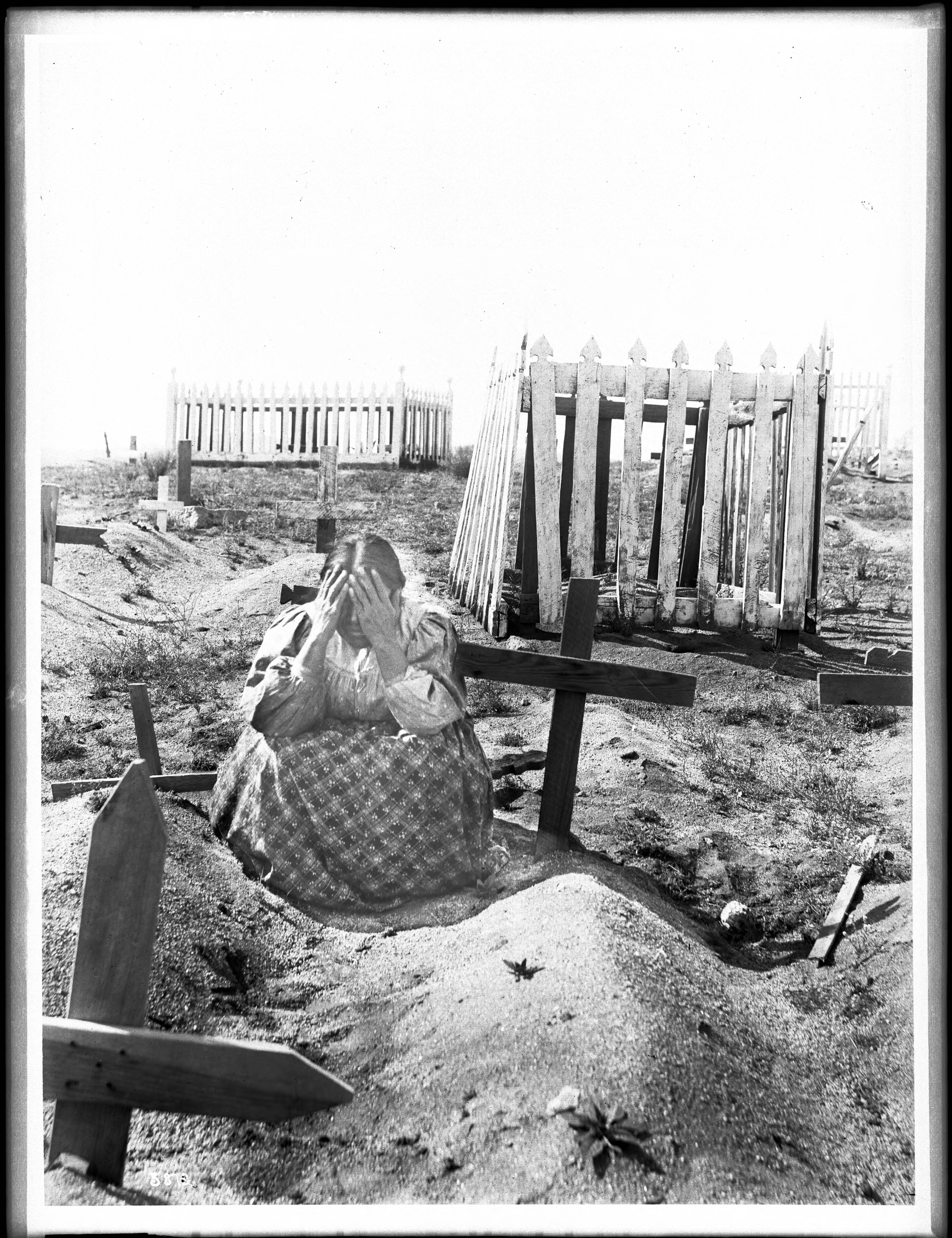
George Wharton James' famous photograph of Ramona at her husband's grave

Along with tourists came the writer George Wharton James, who while researching for his book Through Ramona's Country (1908) recognized Juan Diego as the inspiration for the character Alessandro and wanted to find Diego's wife. Native residents told him to look for Ramona Lubo, whom he found on the Cahuilla Indian Reservation. Upon their meeting, Lubo took him to her husband's grave, where James took a photograph of her crying that he then produced and sold as postcards. The postcards and the book made the public aware of Lubo's existence, and James' titling of her as the "real Ramona" brought tourists to her home. Lubo earned money by selling baskets to tourists, posing for photographs, and appearing at Southern California events such as fairs and orange shows, but she remained poor. Captain Antonio Apache hired her to appear at Indian Village at Eastlake Park in Los Angeles; the San Jacinto Register described how her presence was widely advertised, noting that "while many were skeptical as to her being the genuine Ramona, of Helen Hunt Jackson's book, she proved a drawing card for the Village and thousands of people went there to see her." At these public appearances she would sometimes be accompanied by a younger woman to represent the character "of the Helen Hunt Jackson period" since readers expected the young, beautiful woman of the novel, not an old, poor woman. Newspaper accounts frequently described Lubo as ugly, vulgar, and opportunistic woman and highlighted the contrast between the novel and Lubo's reality. The Ramona Pageant Association planned to bring Lubo to their outdoor performance of the novel in Hemet, California, but she died less than a year before the pageant opened in 1923.

In 1900 James photographed Sam Temple and recorded him with a gramophone recounting his killing of Juan Diego. Temple told him, "I throwed the gun into position and pulled the trigger, put 22 buckshots in the man's breast. You could have covered every one of them with your hand. It had no more effect on stopping that man than if you'd blowed your breath against him." Like Lubo, Temple gained fame from his association with the novel. Some sources state that he appeared at the 1893 World's Columbian Exposition and the 1904 Louis and Clark Exposition while others state that he planned to attend but decided not to after realizing that the popularity was negative. Some people did sympathize with him, however, such as the San Diego Union, which referred to him as a "good fellow in his own way."

Lubo was known to be shy and reluctant to talk about her past. Her friend and neighbor Fanny Contreras said, "When you talk to her and ask her about her past, she didn't want to talk about it, she just would cry. You couldn't get nothing out of her. That was just it, I think she felt so bad."

== Death ==
In February 1922 Lubo contracted pneumonia when she appeared at the National Orange Show in San Bernardino to promote the Hemet-San Jacinto Valley. She died five months later on July 20, 1922, at the age of 69. She was buried on the Cahuilla Reservation next to her husband, each grave marked with a small wooden cross. In 1931 the Ramona Pageant Association began an effort to put monuments on the graves, and on April 10, 1938, Lubo's headstone was revealed. It reads "Ramona" and was designed and carved by local residents. Diego's headstone was erected in 1956, reading, "Alessandro, Ramona's martyred spouse".
