= Augustine Band of Cahuilla Indians =

Indian tribe in California, United States

- Location of the Augustine Reservation

Total population
- 2010: 11

Regions with significant populations
- United States (California)

Languages
- English

Related ethnic groups
- other Cahuilla tribes

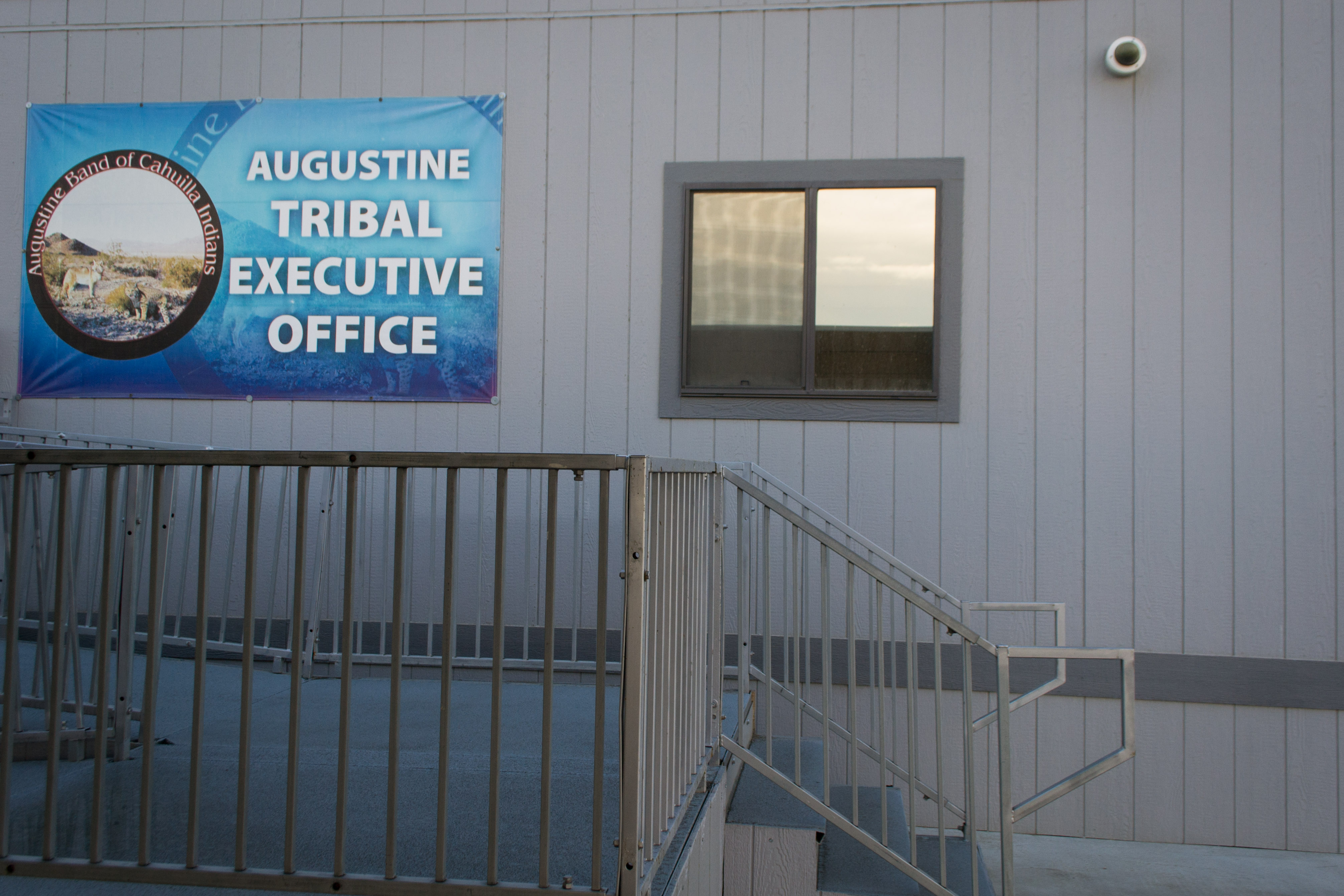
Tribal offices are located near the Augustine Casino in Coachella, California

The Augustine Band of Cahuilla Indians is a federally recognized Cahuilla band of Native Americans based in Coachella, California. They are one of the smallest tribal nations in the United States, consisting of only 16 members, seven of whom are adults.

== Background ==
According to interviews with Augustine Elders in the winter of 1924–1925, the tribe is of the Nanxaiyem clan of Pass Cahuilla. Francisco Nombre, a Desert Cahuilla ceremonial leader and keeper of traditional clan genealogy, stated that the Nanxaiyem migrated to the Coachella Valley around 1860 and their survivors settled at La Mesa, the flat land east of La Quinta, California. There, according to Nombre, they became known as Augustin [sic]. There are over a dozen Pass Cahuilla clans, traditionally following patrilineal descent, and are divided into the Wildcat and Coyote moieties, inhabiting the San Gorgonio Pass eastward to Indian Wells and westward to San Timoteo Canyon. The Nanxaiyem Clan of Augustine Reservation is Coyote moiety.

On April 13, 1956, the Commissioner of Indian Affairs approved a census roll of the tribe, documenting 11 living members. Roberta Augustine, the last original enrollee, died in 1986. The reservation of the Augustine Band of Cahuilla Indians is a one-square-mile (2.6 km^{2}) tract of land, located in Riverside County, California, at 33°39′01″N 116°11′27″W. Thermal, California, and the Cabazon Band of Mission Indians are both nearby. The land was left vacant for half a century, until Chairman Green moved there in 1996.

Mary Ann Green, née Martin, born in 1964, decided to rebuild the tribe and resettle the reservation. On December 29, 1981, the August Band of Mission Indians was established by an Executive Order. Green was elected chairperson in 1988 and held the position until 2016. Under Green, the tribal government, which currently employs eight people, was established in 1994 and their reservation was resettled in 1996. Green's daughter, Amanda Augustine, became tribal chair in 2016 after Green became ill.

Traditional Cahuilla singer, Tony Andreas, grew up on the Augustine Reservation in the 1930s and 1940s.

== Current projects ==
The tribe has developed plans for both cultural revival and economic sustainability.

Improvements to reservation lands include adopting a zoning code and removing illegally dumped garbage. During the 50 years the land was vacant, trash, commercial wastes, carcasses, and thousands of tires were dumped on the land. The monumental cleanup task started in 1994, when the tribe partnered with the US Environmental Service, the California Conservation Corps, the California Integrated Waste Management Board, and the Riverside County Sheriff's Department.

The tribe owns the Augustine Casino in Coachella. Vance, the tribe's chair, is also the CEO of Synergy Blue, a slot machine company based in Las Vegas majority owned by the tribe. Vance and her husband also operate Temalpakh Farms, an organic vegetable farm on the grounds of the tribe.

The Augustine Band built the first photovoltaic renewable energy system on Indian land in California. The system is expected to produce 1,900 megawatts of solar energy annually.

== Other Cahuilla tribes ==
- Agua Caliente Band of Cahuilla Indians of the Agua Caliente Indian Reservation
- Cabazon Band of Mission Indians
- Cahuilla Band of Mission Indians of the Cahuilla Reservation
- Los Coyotes Band of Cahuilla & Cupeno Indians of the Los Coyotes Reservation
- Morongo Band of Mission Indians
- Ramona Band or Village of Cahuilla Mission Indians of California
- Santa Rosa Band of Cahuilla Indians
- Torres-Martinez Desert Cahuilla Indians
