= Bucksnort Mountain =

Mountain in San Diego County, California

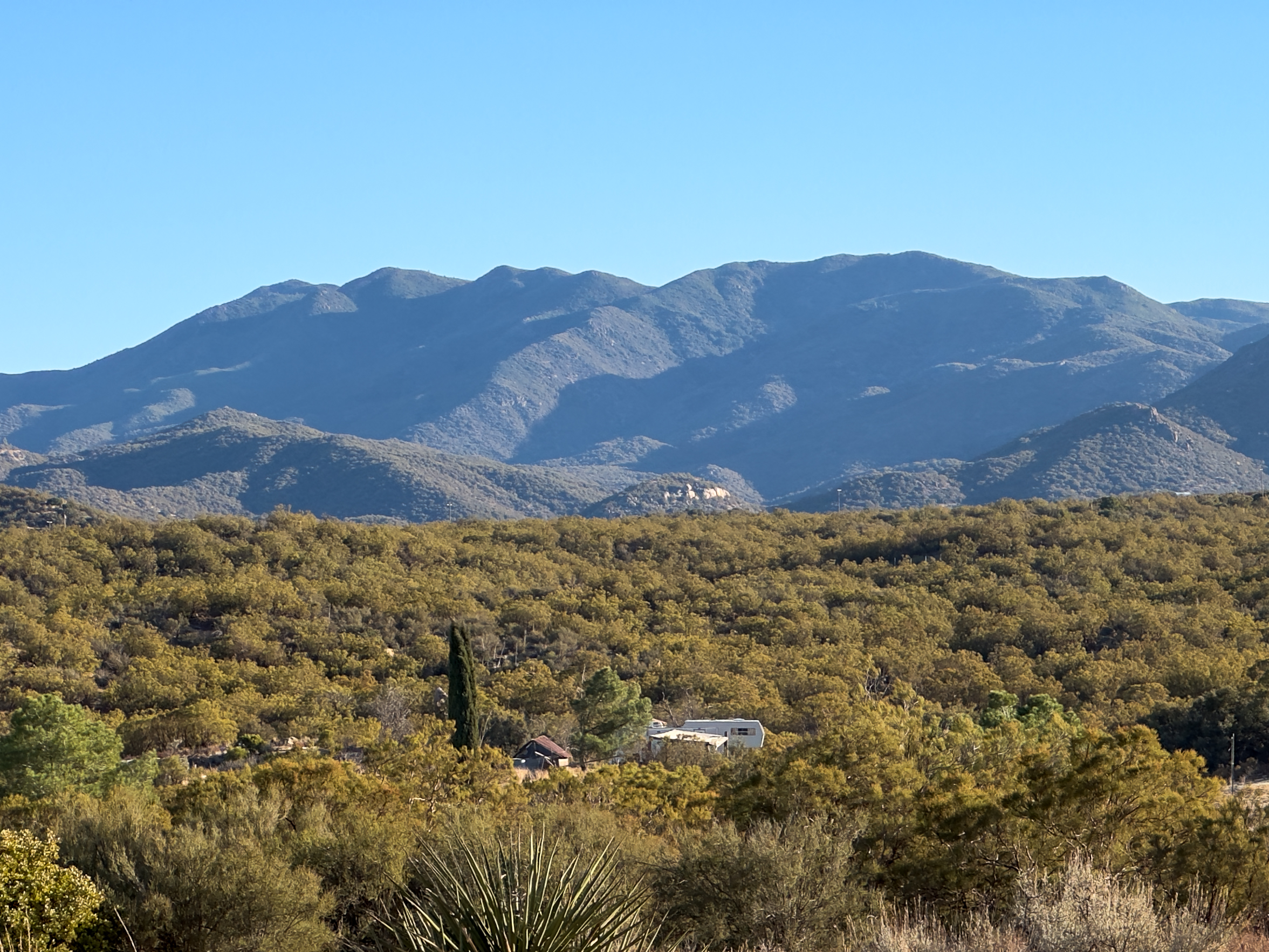
- A view of Bucksnort Mountain from Anza, California

Highest point
- Elevation: 6,172 ft (1,881 m)

Geography
- Location within California Location within the United States
- Country: United States
- State: California
- County: San Diego County
- Range coordinates: 33°23′39.74″N 116°36′20.49″W
- Parent range: Peninsular Ranges

Bucksnort Mountain is a mountain of the Peninsular Ranges System, in San Diego County, California.

== Geography ==
Bucksnort Mountain occurs along the Pacific Crest Trail. It is located near the border of Riverside County and San Diego County. Its summit is called Combs Peak at an elevation of 6,172 feet. Anza-Borrego Desert State Park can be seen from Bucksnort Mountain as one looks east.

== See also ==
- Mountains of San Diego County, California
