= Mary Ann Green =

Native American tribal leader from California

Chairperson of the Augustine Band of Cahuilla Indians
- In office 1988–2016
- Preceded by: Position created
- Succeeded by: Amanda Vance

Personal details
- Born: Mary Ann Martin; 1964
- Died: January 8, 2017 (aged 52–53) Coachella, California, U.S.
- Children: 3
- Profession: Tribal leader, politician

Mary Ann Green (1964 – January 8, 2017) was a Native American tribal leader and politician who served as the chairwoman of the Augustine Band of Cahuilla Indians, a federally recognized Cahuilla tribe based in Coachella, California, from 1988 until 2016. Under Green, who was first elected chairperson in 1988, the Augustine Band of Cahuilla Indians established a tribal government in 1994 and resettled their reservation, located in Coachella, in 1996. She also oversaw the development and establishment of the Augustine Casino, which opened in 2002. Through the casino, the small Augustine Band of Cahuilla Indians is now one of the largest employers in the Coachella Valley, as of 2017.

== Biography ==
Green was born Mary Ann Martin in 1964, years after members of the Augustine Band of Cahuilla Indians had abandoned their reservation and traditional lands surrounding Coachella. (There were only 11 living members of the Augustine Band in 1951, thirteen years before Green's birth). She was raised by her non-Cahuilla grandmother, who was African-American. Green was reportedly unaware of her Native American heritage during her childhood and early adulthood.

In 1981, an executive order recognized and established the Augustine Band of Cahuilla Indians as a federally recognized tribe. However, in 1987, Green's mother Roberta Augustine, the last living member of the Augustine Band, as well as Green's other grandmother, died. Green discovered her previously unknown Cahuilla heritage following her grandmother's death. She eventually decided to move with her children to the Coachella Valley surrounding the Augustine Band of Cahuilla Indians' reservation a few years after the death of her grandmother. Green also gained custody of four of her nieces and nephews following the murder of both her brothers, Gregory and Herbert in a gang shooting in Los Angeles. Together, Green, her children, and her extended family comprised the entire Augustine Band of Cahuilla Indians.

Mary Ann Green became tribal Chairperson in 1988, a position she held until 2016. Under Green, the Augustine Band of Cahuilla Indians established a tribal government in 1994. Two years later, Green and her family resettled the Augustine Band's reservation in Coachella in 1996.

During the 1990s, Green and her government began to explore the possibility of opening a tribal-owned casino in an effort to establish a long-term source of income, economic development, and stable employment for its members. Funds from the casino would also be utilized to preserve traditional Cahuilla culture. Green, who lacked the expertise to open a casino, contracted with Paragon Gaming to establish and temporarily operate the proposed casino for its first five years. The Augustine tribal government and Paragon Gaming funded the construction of the $16 million casino entirely through loans offered by Centaur, a finance company based in Indiana.

Due in large part to the casino, the Augustine Band of Cahuilla Indians is now one of the largest employers in the Coachella Valley.

In addition to the casino, Green also oversaw the creation of other programs designed to provide long-term, economic stability for the small tribe and its members. Her initiatives included the establishment of an organic farm and a 3-megawatt renewable energy project located on the reservation.

On July 18, 2002, the eight member Augustine Band of Cahuilla Indians, led by Green, opened its casino in Coachella, California. The $16 million casino included 349 slot machines and only 10 card tables at the time of 2002 opening, less than the original plans had called for. Dignitaries in attendance included the leaders of several California tribes, as well as Tony Andreas, a traditional Cahuilla bird song singer who had been raised on the Augustine Band of Cahuilla Indians' reservation during the 1930s and 1940s before its abandonment.

Green died on January 8, 2017, at her home in Coachella, California, following a long illness. She was survived by her three children, Amanda Vance, who succeeded her as the Chairperson of the Augustine Band, Ronnie and William Vance, and three grandchildren. Her funeral, an all-night wake, was held at the Torres-Martinez Great Hall and Gymnasium in Thermal, California, on January 20, 2017, with burial at the Augustine Band of Cahuilla Indians' Tribal Cemetery in Coachella.

== See also ==
- List of Native American politicians
- Native American women in politics
