= Ramona Band of Cahuilla =

Native Cahuilla Indians in Southern California

Coordinates: 33°36′20″N 116°41′50″W

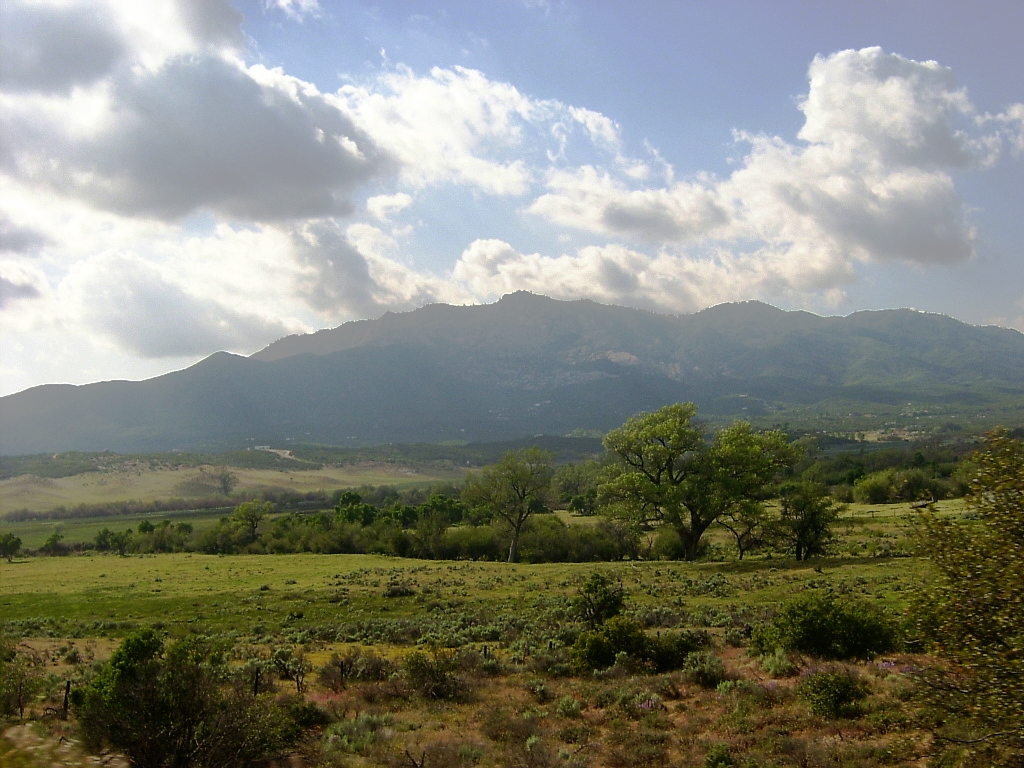
- The Cahuilla Mountains in Anza, California

Regions with significant populations
- United States (California)

Languages
- English, Cahuilla language

Religion
- traditional tribal religion, Christianity (Roman Catholicism)

Related ethnic groups
- Cahuilla tribes

The Ramona Band of Cahuilla is a federally recognized tribe of Cahuilla Indians, located in Riverside County, California.

== Reservation ==
The Ramona Indian Reservation was founded in 1893. It is about 560 acres (2.3 km^{2}) large, located in Anza, California at the foot of Thomas Mountain. The land was originally Sauppalpisa territory and was a traditional gathering place for Cahuilla ceremonies.

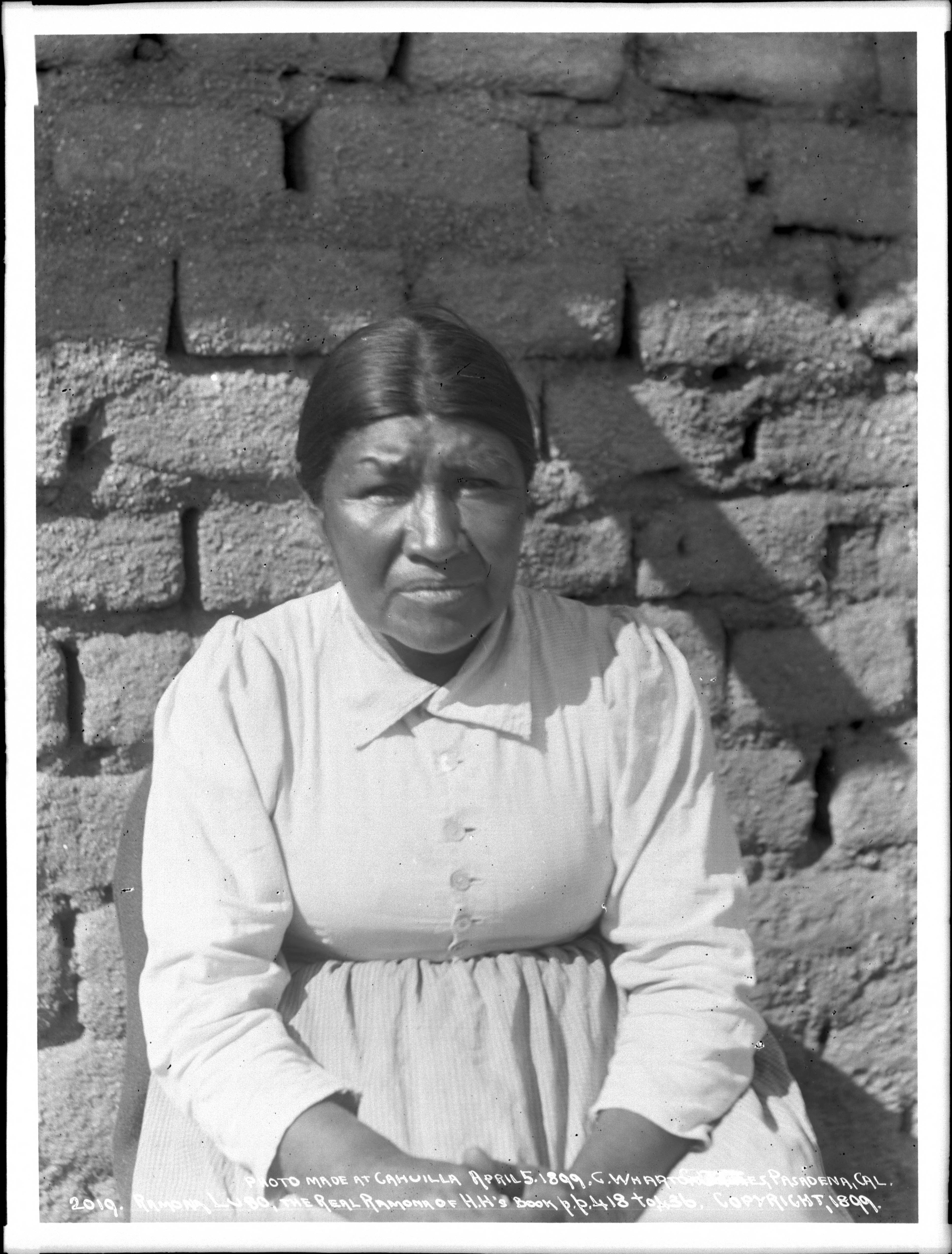
Ramona Lubo, after whom the novel Ramona may have been named.

== Government ==
The tribe's headquarters is located in Anza, California. Their current Tribal Chairwoman is Danae Hamilton Vega.

== See also ==
- Mission Indians
