= Cahuilla =

Indigenous people of Southern California, U.S.

Cahuilla ’Ivilluwenetem
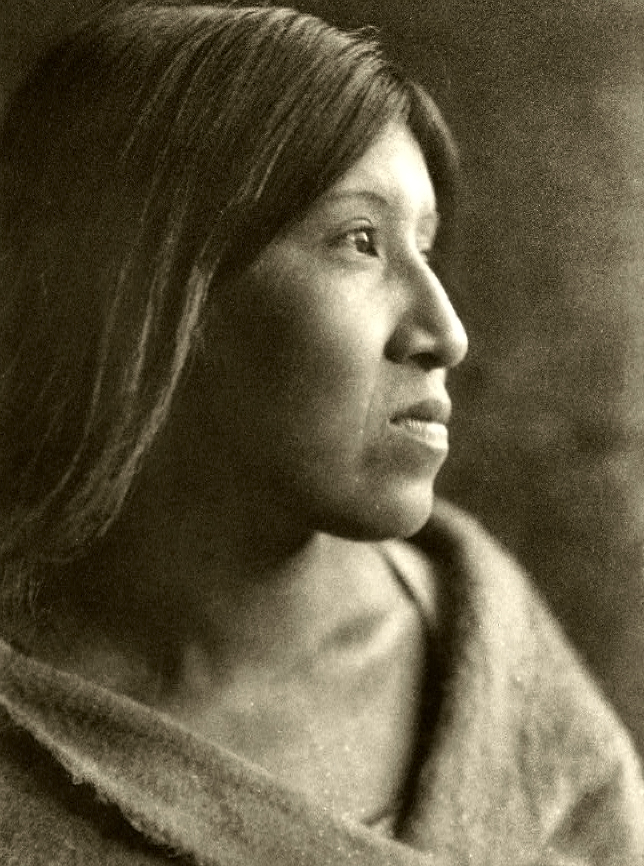
- Desert Cahuilla woman, photographed by Edward S. Curtis, 1926

Total population
- 2010: 4,238 alone and in combination

Regions with significant populations
- United States (California)

Languages
- English, Spanish, Cahuilla language

Religion
- Christianity (Roman Catholic, Moravian, Protestant), and traditional tribal religion

Related ethnic groups
- Cupeño, Luiseño, Serrano, and Tongva

- Person: 'Ivilluqalet
- People: 'Ivilluwenetem
- Language: 'Ivillu'at
- Country: 'Ivilluwenetem Meytemak

The Cahuilla, also known as ’Ivilluwenetem, are a Native American people of the various tribes of the Cahuilla Nation, living in the inland areas of southern California. Their original territory encompassed about 2,400 square miles (6,200 km^{2}). The traditional Cahuilla territory was near the geographic center of Southern California. It was bounded to the north by the San Bernardino Mountains, to the south by Borrego Springs and the Chocolate Mountains, to the east by the Colorado Desert, and to the west by the San Jacinto Plain and the eastern slopes of the Palomar Mountains.

== Language and name ==
The Cahuilla language is in the Uto-Aztecan family. A 1990 census revealed 35 speakers in an ethnic population of 800. It is critically endangered, since most speakers are middle-aged or older. In their language, their autonym is ’Ivilluwenetem (’Ivilluqalet in the singular), and the name of their language is ’Ivillu’at (Ivilyuat), but they also call themselves taxliswet, meaning "person" or Taxstem, which means "People". Cahuilla is an exonym applied to the group after mission secularization in the Ranchos of California. The word "Cahuilla" is probably from the Ivilyuat word kawiʔa, meaning "master."

== Prehistory ==
Historic distribution of Cahuilla

Oral legends suggest that when the Cahuilla first moved into the Coachella Valley, a large body of water that geographers call Lake Cahuilla existed. Fed by the Colorado River, it dried up sometime before 1700, after one of the repeated shifts in the river's course. In 1905 a break in a levee created the much smaller Salton Sea in the same location.

The Cahuilla lived off the land by using native plants. A notable tree whose fruits they harvested is the California fan palm. The Cahuilla also used palm leaves for basketry of many shapes, sizes, and purposes; sandals; and roofing thatch for dwellings. They lived in smaller groups than some other tribes.

== History ==
The Cahuilla's first encounter with Europeans was in 1774, when Juan Bautista de Anza was looking for a trade route between Sonora and Monterey in Alta California. Living far inland, the Cahuilla had little contact with Spanish soldiers, priests, or missionaries. Many European settlers and tradespeople viewed the desert as of little or no value and to be avoided. The Cahuilla learned of Spanish missions and their culture from Indians living close to missions in San Gabriel and San Diego. The Cahuilla provided security against the raids of the tribes from the desert and mountains on its herds for the vaqueros who worked for the owners of the Rancho San Bernardino.

The Cahuilla did not encounter Anglo-Americans until the 1840s. Chief Juan Antonio, leader of the Cahuilla Mountain Band, gave traveler Daniel Sexton access to areas near the San Gorgonio Pass in 1842. The Mountain Band also lent support to a U.S. Army expedition led by Lieutenant Edward Fitzgerald Beale, defending it against attacks by Wakara and his band of Ute warriors.

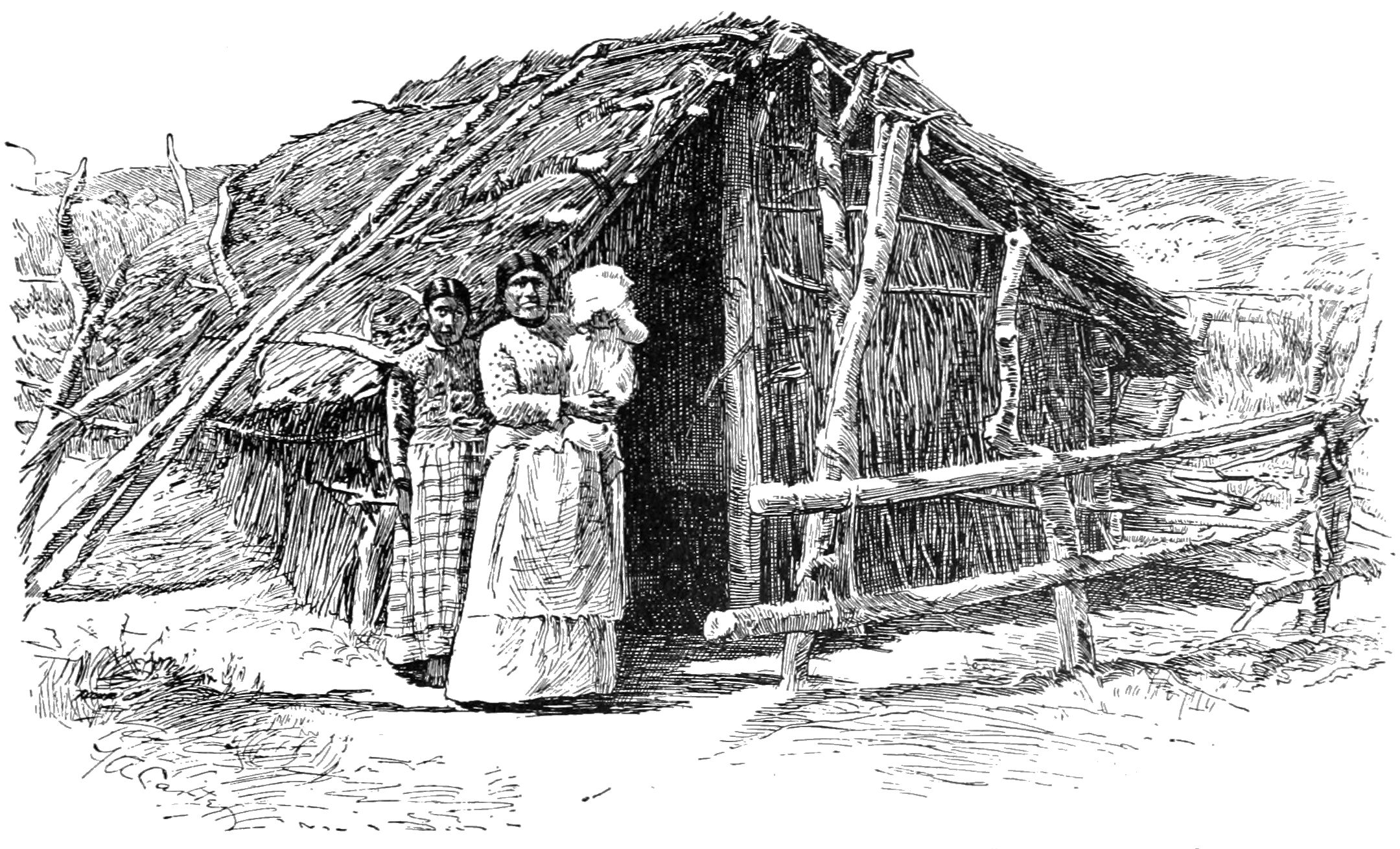
19th century Cahuilla hut

Kawia woman. Kawia is alternate spelling for Cahuilla.

Kawia man. Kawia is alternate spelling for Cahuilla.

During the Mexican–American War, Juan Antonio led his warriors to join Californios led by José del Carmen Lugo in attacking their traditional enemy, the Luiseño. Lugo led this action in retaliation for the Pauma Massacre, in which the Luiseno had killed 11 Californios. The combined forces staged an ambush and killed 33–40 Luiseno warriors, an event that became known as the Temecula Massacre of 1847. (Historians disagree on the exact number of deaths; Luiseno oral tradition holds that more than 100 warriors were killed.) In the treaty ending the war with Mexico, the US promised to honor Mexican land grants and policies. These included recognition of Native American rights to inhabit certain lands, but European-American encroachment on Indian lands became an increasing problem after the US annexed California.

During the 1850s, the Cahuilla came under increasing pressure from waves of European-American migrants because of the California Gold Rush. In 1851, Juan Antonio led his warriors in the destruction of the Irving Gang, a group of bandits that had been looting the San Bernardino Valley. After the outcome of the Irving Gang incident, in late 1851, Juan Antonio, his warriors and their families, moved eastward from Politana toward the San Gorgonio Pass and settled in a valley that branched off to the northeast from San Timoteo Canyon, at a village named Saahatpa.

In addition to the influx of Anglo-American miners, ranchers and outlaws, and groups of Mormon colonists, the Cahuilla came into conflict with the neighboring Cupeño tribe to the west. In November 1851, the Garra Revolt occurred, wherein the Cupeno leader Antonio Garra attempted to bring Juan Antonio into his revolt. Juan Antonio, friendly to the Americans, was instrumental in capturing Garra, ending that revolt.

When the California Senate refused to ratify an 1852 treaty granting the Cahuilla control of their land, some tribal leaders resorted to attacks on approaching settlers and soldiers. Juan Antonio did not participate in this as long as he lived.

To encourage the railroad, the U.S. government subdivided the lands into one-mile-square sections, giving the Indians every other section. In 1877 the government established reservation boundaries, which left the Cahuilla with only a small portion of their traditional territories.

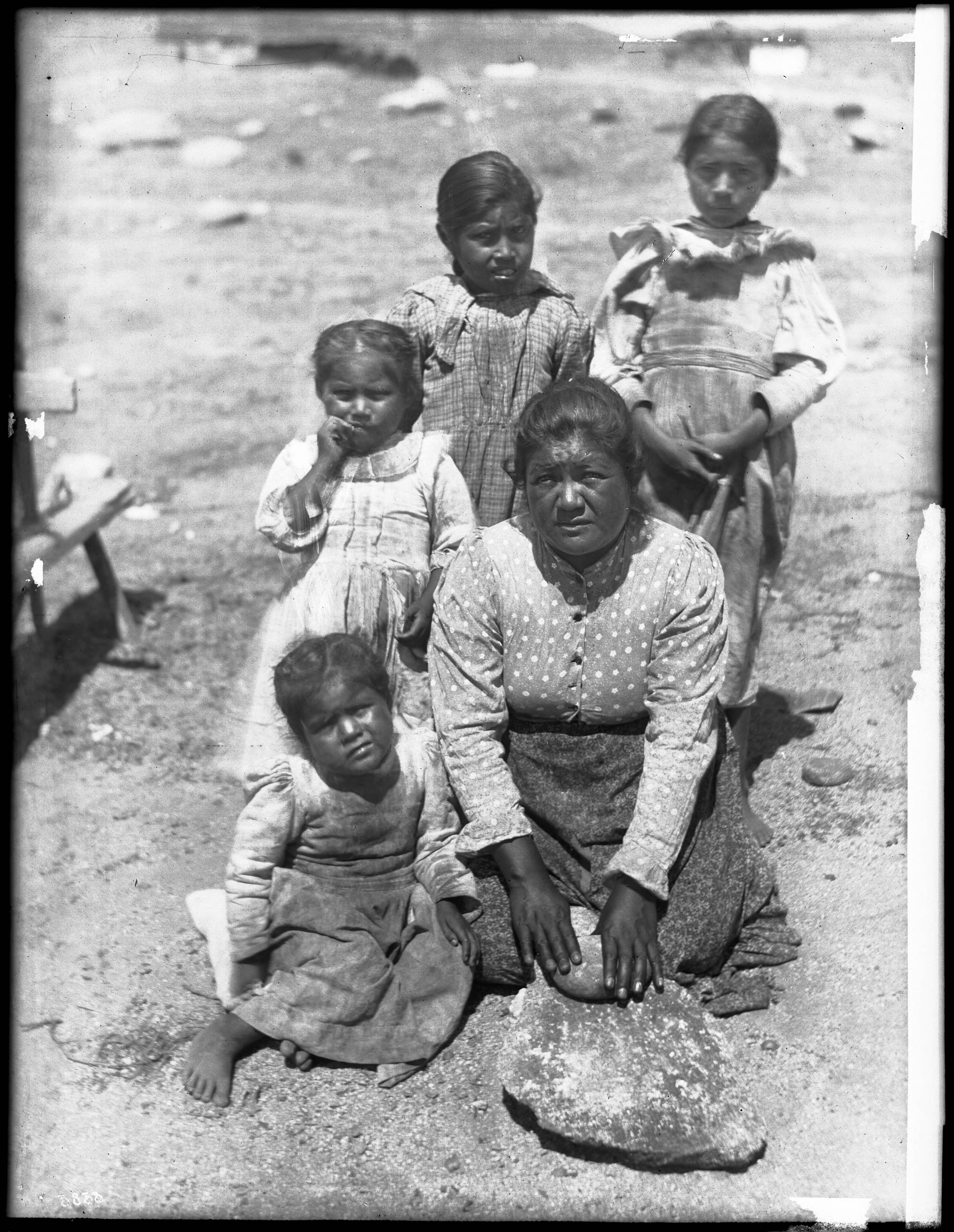
Cahuilla woman and children (1903)

The Cahuilla have intermarried with non-Cahuilla for the past century. A high proportion of today's Cahuilla tribal members have mixed ancestry, especially Spanish and African American. People who have grown up in the tribe's ways and identify culturally with the Cahuilla may qualify for official tribal membership by the tribe's internal rules. Each federally recognized tribe sets its own rules for membership.

== Culture ==
=== Cuisine ===
While Cahuilla men engaged in hunting deer and rabbits, the tribe relied more heavily on desert vegetation for sustenance. Acorns held significance for the Cahuilla; however, due to the scarcity of water and the arid environment in the desert, oak trees were not prevalent in much of their territory. A more frequently consumed food among the desert inhabitants was the fruit of the mesquite tree, which possesses deep roots that access water. During the summer months, the green bean pods from this tree were processed into a beverage. The tribe also utilized agave and yucca plants as food sources. Various desert cacti yielded edible fruits, as did the palm tree. The Cahuilla harvested seeds from juniper and pine trees, in addition to chia seeds and seeds from other plants. Furthermore, several types of berries were dried and ground into a meal.

== Current status ==
Today Palm Springs and the surrounding areas are experiencing rapid development. The Agua Caliente Band of the Cahuilla is an important player in the local economy, operating an array of business enterprises, including land leasing, hotel and casino operations, and banking.

The Agua Caliente Indian Reservation occupies 126.706 km^{2} (48.921 sq mi) in the Palm Springs area, including parts of the cities of Palm Springs, Cathedral City, and Rancho Mirage. The total population living on its territory was 21,358 as of the 2000 census, although few of these are registered tribal members.

The Morongo Band of Mission Indians, also considered part of the Cahuilla nation, operates the Morongo Casino, Resort & Spa, as well as the Hadley Fruit Orchards in Cabazon. The Morongo Casino is one of the largest Indian casinos in the United States. The Morongo Indian Reservation is in northern Riverside County. The city of Banning and community of Cabazon both extend partially onto reservation land. The reservation has a land area of 127.083 km^{2} (49.067 sq mi), with a resident population of 954, the majority of Native American heritage.

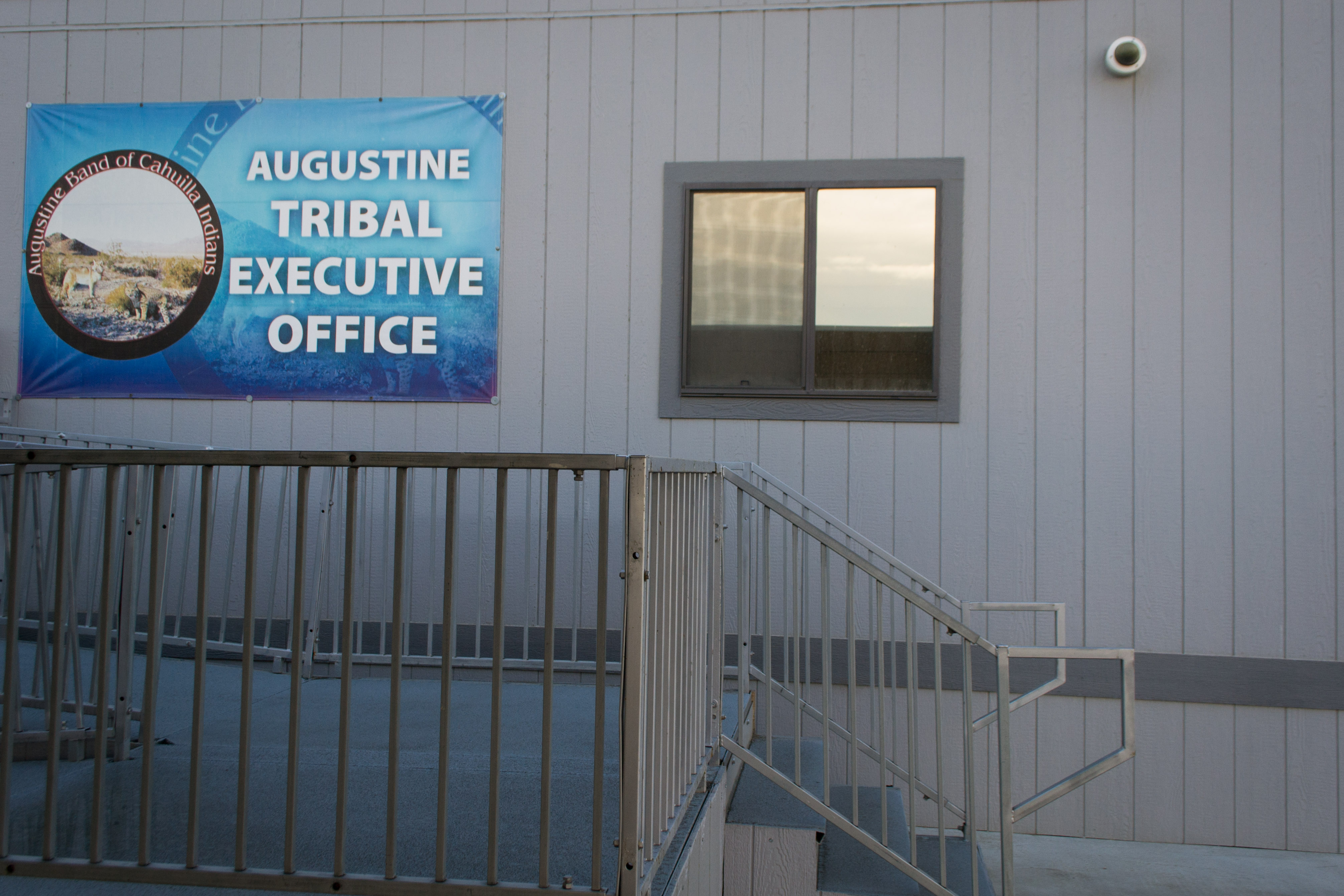
Office of the Augustine Band

Smaller bands of Cahuilla are in Southern California: the Augustine Band in Coachella (their village was La Mesa in the 1880s-90s); the Cabazon Band in Indio (their one-square-mile reservation now "Sonora-Lupine Lanes" in Old Town Indio); the Cabazon Reservations in Indio, Coachella, and Mecca (separate from Cabazon band); the Cahuilla Band in Anza; the Los Coyotes Band in Warner Springs (San Diego County); the Ramona Indian Reservation in Pine Meadow; Santa Rosa Indian Reservation in Pinyon; the Twentynine Palms Band in Twentynine Palms, Indio, and Coachella ("Dates Lane" community); the Torres-Martinez Band in La Quinta (was Rancho Santa Carmelita in Spanish-Mexican-1850s California times), Coachella, Thermal, Mecca, and Oasis; and the Mission Creek Reservation in Desert Hot Springs.

The Torres-Martinez tribe has offices throughout Southern California, offering TANF (Temporary Assistance for Needy Families) benefits for members. They are in Imperial Valley (El Centro), Blythe, Riverside, San Bernardino, Victorville, Palmdale, San Diego, Orange County (Santa Ana), Pomona, and Los Angeles. This is a result of Cahuilla migration to farming and factory jobs in the second half of the 20th century.

The ethnic composition of the Cahuilla descendants is like that of many other Americans: mixed with European (especially Anglo/Irish-American and Spanish), African American, Asian-American (from historic interaction with Chinese railroad workers and Filipino farm laborers), and other tribal groups, mainly Apache migrant workers from Arizona. Some Cahuilla families continue to intermarry with local populations; others try to marry within Native American tribes.

To recognize Cahuilla history and cultural heritage, the University of California, Riverside, located on historically Cahuilla land, has created a land acknowledgment mentioning the Cahuilla and other local Indigenous peoples.

== Federally recognized tribes ==
Anthropologists have historically divided the Cahuilla into "Mountain," "Desert," and "(San Gorgonio) Pass" or "Western" groups. Today, there are nine Southern California reservations that are acknowledged homes to bands of Cahuilla. These are in Imperial, Riverside, and San Diego Counties and are the territory of federally recognized tribes.

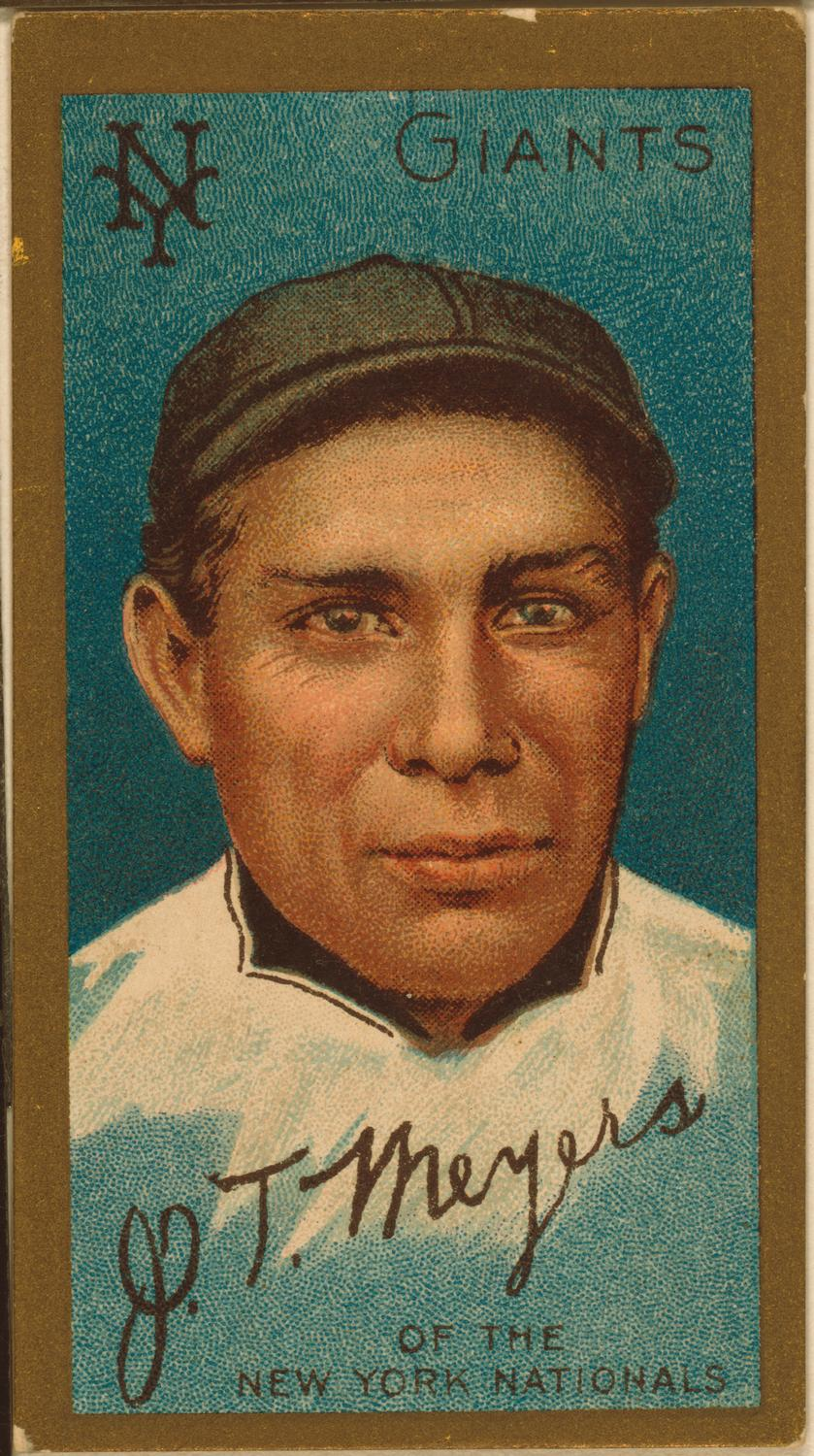
John Tortes "Chief" Meyers was a catcher in major league baseball

The Cahuilla bands (sometimes called "villages") are:

"Pass" Cahuilla or "Western" Cahuilla (on San Gorgonio Pass, centering in Palm Springs and Palm Desert in Coachella Valley, wandering north to Desert Hot Springs)

- Agua Caliente Band of Cahuilla Indians of the Agua Caliente Indian Reservation (main clans: Kawasic, Kauisik, Kauisiktum ("fox or rock People", at Palm Springs area), Painakic, Panic, Paniktum (″People of Daylight″, of Andreas and Murray Canyons), Atcitcem, Ahchechem (″People of Good″, of Lower Palm Canyon, later at Indian Wells), Wanikik, Wainikik (″Running Water People″, Snowcreek and Whitewater Canyon, now most part of Morongo Band), and another clan (its identity has been lost), headquarters at Palm Springs, California (Cahuilla: Se-Khi, Sec-he - ″boiling water″), the Spanish who arrived named it Agua Caliente - ″hot water″)
- Morongo Band of Cahuilla Mission Indians of the Morongo Reservation (Wanikik, Wainikik and Kawasic, Kauisik, Kauisiktum clan, and Serrano, tribal members also include Cupeño, Luiseño, and Chemehuevi Indians, headquarters at Banning, California.)
- Mission Creek Band (Kilyinakiktum and Wanikik, Wainikik clans and the mixed Cahuilla-Serrano clan Marongam (in Serrano: Morongo),⁣ Serrano, and Cupeño peoples, headquarters at Desert Hot Springs, California on Mission Creek (Yamesével), a tributary of the Whitewater River north of the Salton Sea)

"Mountain" Cahuilla (Santa Rosa and San Jacinto Mountains)

- Cahuilla Band of Mission Indians of the Cahuilla Reservation (Natcutakiktum (″Sand People″, from Horse Canyon), headquartered at Anza, California)
- Los Coyotes Band of Cahuilla and Cupeno Indians of the Los Coyotes Reservation (first Wiwaiistam (″Coyote People″, from Coyote Canyon) (and Sauicpakiktum, Sawish-pakiktem lineage — later Isilsiveyyaiutcem clan although, and Cupeño, headquarters at Warner Springs, California)
- Ramona Band of Cahuilla Mission Indians (Apapatcem (″Medicine People″) clan, headquarters at Anza, California)
- Santa Rosa Band of Cahuilla Indians (original dominated by the Costakiktum, Costai-kiktem and Natcutakiktum, together with Pauatiauitcem, Pauata-kiktum, Tepamokiktum, and Temewhanic (″Northerners″), later Guanche-pakiktem and some Sauicpakiktum, Sawish-pakiktem (from Rockhouse Canyon) clans, headquarters at Hemet, California)

"Desert" Cahuilla (deserts of northern Lake Cahuilla area)

- Augustine Band of Cahuilla Indians (Nanxaiyem clan (originally a "Pass" Cahuilla clan), headquarters at Coachella, California)
- Cabazon Band of Mission Indians (Kawisiktum, Kaunukalkiktum (″Living at kaunukvela People), Iviatim (″Cahuilla language speaking People″), Telakiktum, Mumkwitcem (″Always sick People″), Palpunivikiktum (″People living at water, circling territory″), Tamolanitcem, Tamulanitcum (″Knees bent Together People″), Tevivakiktum (″Round Basket People″), Tuikikiktum (″People at Tuikiktumhemki village″, subordinate the Kauwicpameauitcem) clans, late 19th century although Wantcinakik Tamianawitcem territory, through Chief Cabazon the Kauwicpameauitcem (″Caught By the Rock People″) clan dominated this area, headquarters at Indio, California, called Pàl téwet)
- Torres-Martinez Desert Cahuilla Indians (own name: ″Mau-Wal-Mah Su-Kutt Menyil″, or ″Deer Moon Among the Palms″, Panakauissiktum (″water fox People″), Palpunivikiktum, Tamolanitcem, Tamulanitcum and later Sawalakiktum, Wakaikiktum (″Night Heron People″, which in turn became Panakauissiktum), and Sewahilem (″Mesquite that is not sweet People″) clans (Torres (Toro) area; Maulma, Mauulmii - ″among the palms″) and Mumletcem (″Mixed Up People″), Masuwitcem (″Long Hairs in the Nose People″), Wiitem (″Grasshoppers People″), Wantcauem (″Touched By the River People″), Autaatem (″High Up People″), Awilem (″Dogs People″), Watcinakiktum, Wantcinakiktum clans (later known as Isilsiveyyaiutcem, subordinate Awilem clan), and late 1870s Sauicpakiktum, Sawish-pakiktem (Martinez & Martinez Canyon area; Soqut Menyily, So-kut Men-yil - "Lady moon [figure in creation myth]") clans, and Chemehuevi Indians, headquarters at Thermal, California, Telmuva - "dark resin or sap from mesquite tree")

== Notable historical Cahuilla people ==
Contemporary people are listed on their specific tribes' articles.

- Juan Antonio (Cahuilla Band, 1783-1863), major chief of the Mountain Cahuilla
- Ramona Lubo (1865-1922), basketmaker and icon of Helen Hunt Jackson's novel Ramona
- Marigold Linton (Morongo Band, b. 1936), cognitive psychologist
- Ruby E. Modesto (Torres Martinez Desert Cahuilla, 1913–1980), medicine woman, author, and language instructor
- John Tortes "Chief" Meyers (Cahuilla Band, 1880–1971), Major League baseball catcher
- Katherine Siva Saubel (Los Coyotes, 1920–2011), language preservationist and former tribal chairperson
- Gerald Clarke (Cahuilla Band), Artist and educator

== See also ==
- Agua Caliente Cultural Museum
- Cahuilla mythology
- Cahuilla traditional narratives
- Golden Checkerboard
- Muut
- O. M. Wozencraft negotiated the Treaty of Temecula on January 5, 1852.
