= Ramona =

1884 novel by Helen Hunt Jackson

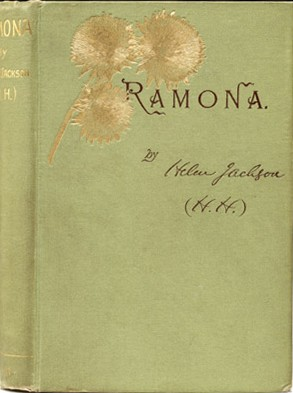
- 1884 first edition
- Author: Helen Hunt Jackson
- Language: English
- Genre: Novel
- Publisher: Little, Brown
- Publication date: 1884
- Publication place: United States
- Media type: Print (Hardback & Paperback)
- Pages: 335 (2007 ed.)
- ISBN: 0812973518 (modern)
- OCLC: 56686628

Ramona is an 1884 American novel written by Helen Hunt Jackson. Set in Southern California after the Mexican–American War and annexation of the territory by the United States, Ramona explores the life of a mixed-race Scottish–Native American orphan girl. The story was inspired by the marriage of Hugo Reid and Victoria Reid.

Originally serialized weekly in the Christian Union, the novel became immensely popular. It has had more than 300 printings, and has been adapted five times as a film. A play adaptation has been performed annually outdoors since 1923.

The novel's influence on the culture and image of Southern California was considerable. Its sentimental portrayal of Mexican elite colonial life contributed to establishing a unique cultural identity for the region. As its publication coincided with the arrival of railroad lines in the region, tourists used trains to visit sites thought to be associated with the novel.

== Plot ==
In Southern California, shortly after the Mexican–American War, a Scottish-Native American orphan girl, Ramona, is raised by Señora Gonzaga Moreno, the sister of Ramona's deceased foster mother. Ramona is referred to as illegitimate in some summaries of the novel, but chapter 3 of the novel says that Ramona's parents were married by a priest in the San Gabriel Mission. Señora Moreno has raised Ramona as part of the family, giving her every luxury. Ramona's foster mother had requested this as her dying wish. Because Ramona has partial Native American heritage, Moreno reserves her love for her only child, Felipe Moreno, whom she adores. Señora Moreno identifies as Mexican of pure Spanish ancestry. She hates Americans since the United States' annexation of California following its victory in the war. They have disputed her claim to her lands, and have divided her huge rancho.

Señora Moreno delays the sheep shearing, a major event on the rancho, awaiting the arrival of a group of Native Americans from Temecula, whom she always hires for that work. The head of the Native American sheep shearers is Alessandro, son of Pablo Assís, chief of the tribe. Alessandro is portrayed as tall, wise, honest, and piously Catholic. Señora Moreno also awaits a priest, Father Salvierderra, from Santa Barbara. He will hear confessions of the workers and celebrate mass with them in her chapel after the shearing, before they return to Temecula.

Alessandro quickly falls in love with Ramona and agrees to stay on at the Rancho. In time, Ramona also falls in love with Alessandro. Señora Moreno opposes the marriage, as she does not want Ramona to marry a Native American. Realizing that Señora Moreno has never loved her, Ramona elopes with Alessandro.

The rest of the novel charts the two lovers' troubles. They have a daughter, and travel around Southern California trying to find a place to settle. In the aftermath of war, Alessandro's tribe is driven off their land, marking a new wave of European-American settlement in California from the United States. They endure misery and hardship, for the Americans who buy their land also demand their houses and their farm tools. Greedy Americans drive them off several homesteads, and they cannot find a permanent community that is not threatened by encroachment of American settlers. They finally move into the San Bernardino Mountains.

Alessandro slowly loses his mind, due to the forced relocations. He loves Ramona fiercely, and regrets having taken her away from relative comfort with Moreno. Their daughter, whose Native American name means "Eyes of the Sky", dies because an American doctor would not go to their homestead to treat her. They have another daughter, whom they name Ramona, but Alessandro still suffers. One day he rides off with the horse of an American, who follows him and shoots him, although he knew that Alessandro was mentally unbalanced.

After being away from the Moreno ranch for two years, the young widow is found by Felipe Moreno, whose mother has died. He brings her and her daughter Ramona back to his mother's estate. Felipe has always loved the elder Ramona and finds her more beautiful than ever. Although Ramona still loves the late Alessandro, she agrees to marry Felipe. They have several children together, but their favorite is Ramona, daughter of Alessandro.

== Main characters ==
- Ramona, Scottish-Native American orphan girl
- Señora Gonzaga Moreno, sister of Ramona's dead foster mother
- Felipe Moreno, Gonzaga Moreno's only child
- Alessandro Assis, a young Native American sheepherder
- Father Salvierderra, a Catholic priest

== Major themes ==
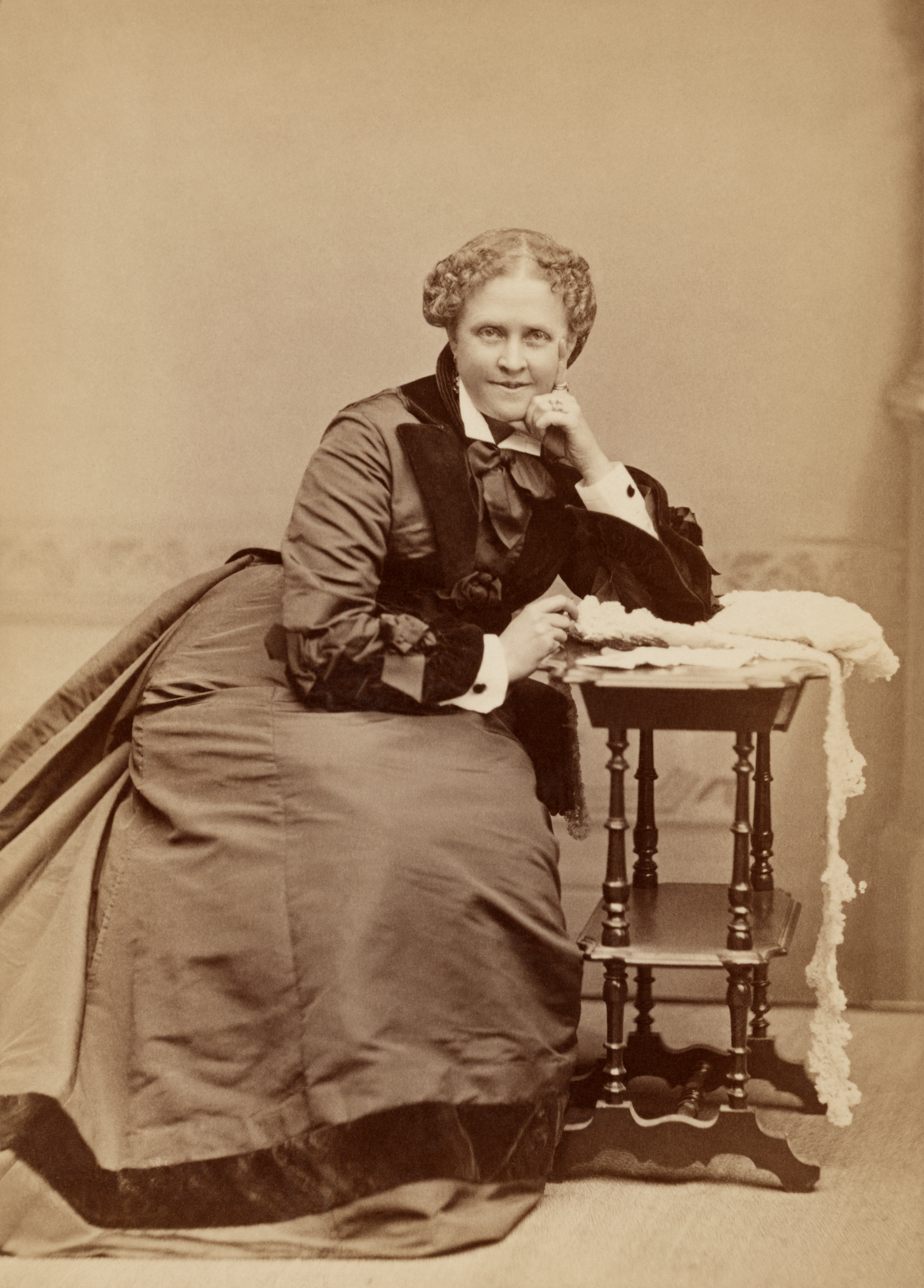
Helen Hunt Jackson around the time she wrote Ramona

Jackson wrote Ramona three years after A Century of Dishonor, her non-fiction study of the mistreatment of Native Americans in the United States. By following that history with a novel, she sought to portray the Indian experience "in a way to move people's hearts." She wanted to arouse public opinion and concern for the betterment of their plight, much as Harriet Beecher Stowe's novel Uncle Tom's Cabin had done for enslaved African Americans. Her success in this effort was limited.

Jackson intended Ramona to appeal directly to the reader's emotions. The novel's political criticism was clear, but most readers were moved by its romantic vision of colonial California under Mexican rule. Jackson had become enamored of the Spanish missions in California, which she romanticized. The story's fictional vision of Franciscan churchmen, señoritas and caballeros permeated the novel and captured the imaginations of readers. Her novel characterized the Americans as villains and the Native Americans as "noble savages".

Many American migrants to California were biased against the Mexicans who lived there. The new settlers from northern and midwestern states disparaged what they considered a decadent culture of leisure and recreation among the elite Mexicans, who held huge tracts of land, lived in a region with prevailing mild weather and unusually fertile soil, and relied heavily on Native American laborers. The new settlers favored the Protestant work ethic. This view was not universal, however.

Many American settlers and readers in other regions were taken by Jackson's portrayal of the California-Mexican society. Readers accepted the Californio aristocracy as portrayed and the Ramona myth was born.

== Reception ==
Ramona was immensely popular almost immediately upon its publication in 1884, with more than 15,000 copies sold in the ten months before Jackson's death in 1885. One year after her death, the North American Review called it "unquestionably the best novel yet produced by an American woman" and named it, along with Uncle Tom's Cabin, as one of two most ethical novels of the 19th century. By sixty years after its publication, 600,000 copies had been sold. There have been more than 300 reissues to date and the book has never been out of print.

Subtle racism may have contributed to the popularity of the character of Ramona and the novel. Of mixed race, she was described as beautiful, with black hair and blue eyes. Errol Wayne Stevens, of the California Historical Society, notes several contemporary reviews of the novel in which writers dismissed the idea that Ramona could have been part Native American, a race which they characterized as "dull, heavy and unimpressionable," and "lazy, cruel, cowardly, and covetous."

Carobeth Laird, in her 1975 autobiography, Encounter with an Angry God (p. 176), describes the reaction of her Chemehuevi Indian husband to the novel: "... when I tried to read him Helen Hunt Jackson's Ramona, he grew restless, walked up and down, and finally said that the white woman knew nothing about Indians."

Jackson was disappointed that she was unable to raise public concerns about the struggles of Indians in California, as readers were attracted to the romantic vision of Californio society. Historian Antoinette May argues in her book The Annotated Ramona (1989) that the popularity of the novel contributed to Congress passing the Dawes Act in 1887. This was the first American law to address Indian land rights, but it was aimed at the assimilation of Indian families. It forced the breakup of communal lands and the redistribution of allotted acres to individual households. The government defined as "surplus land" any reservation territory remaining, and allowed its sale to non-Native persons.

== Cultural influence ==
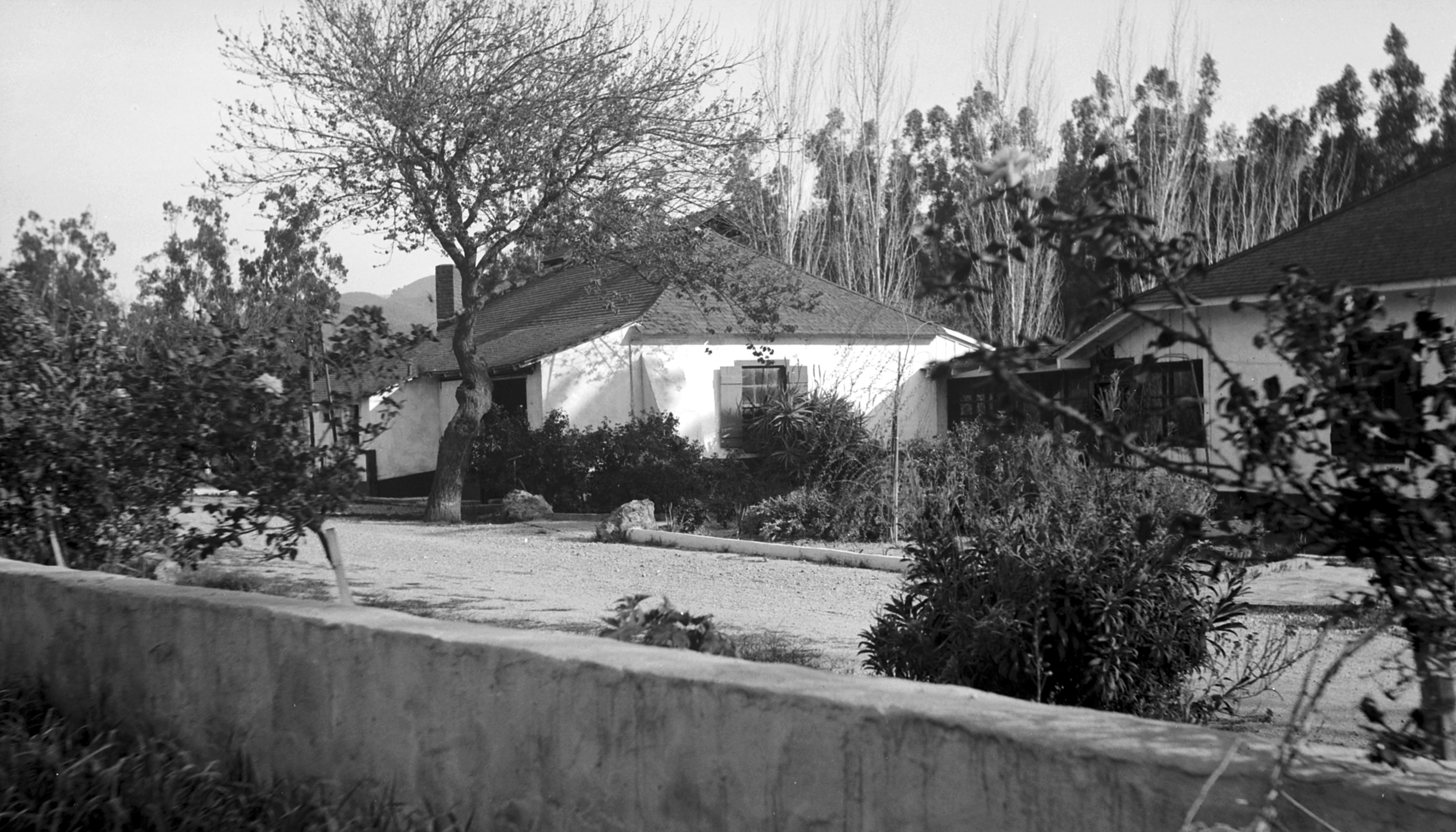
Rancho Camulos

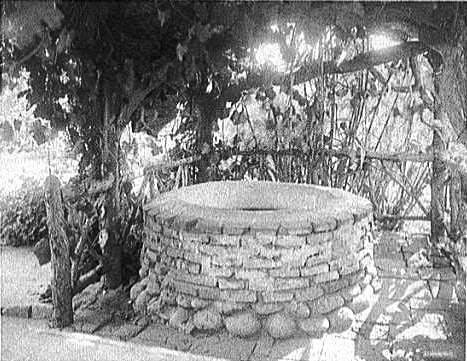
Wishing well, Ramona's Marriage Place

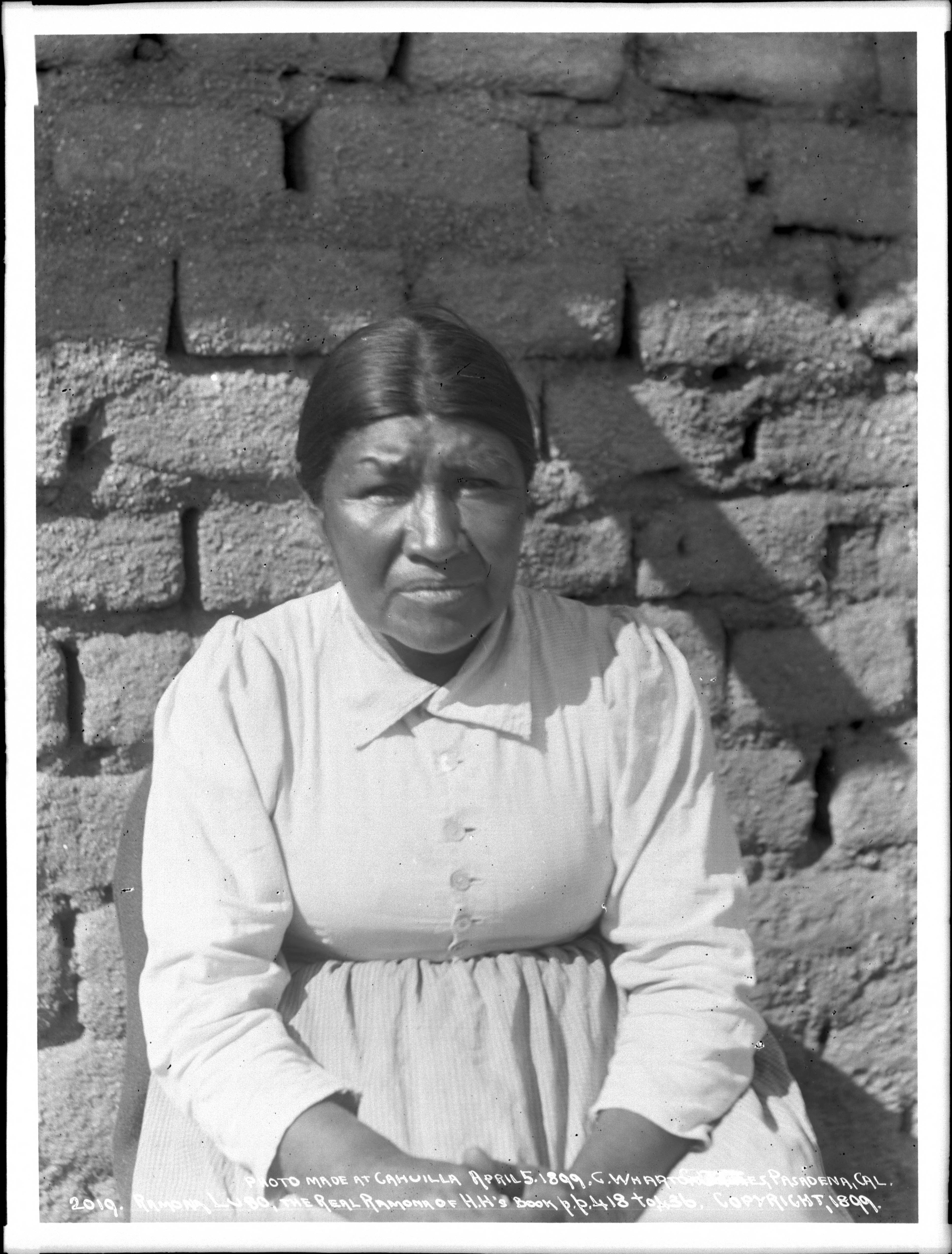
Ramona Lubo, after whom the novel was named, many claimed

The widespread popularity of the novel resulted in jurisdictions naming schools (Ramona High School in Riverside), streets, freeways (the San Bernardino Freeway was originally named the Ramona Freeway) and towns (unincorporated communities called Ramona in both Los Angeles and San Diego Counties) after the novel's heroine. Southern California became a tourist destination, as many people wanted to see the locations featured in the book. Its publication coincided with the opening of Southern Pacific Railroad's Southern California rail lines, which fed a tourism boom.

As a result, many sites across Southern California tried to emphasize their Ramona connections. Jackson died without having specified locations for her novel. Two places claimed to have inspired her work: Rancho Camulos, near Piru, and Rancho Guajome in Vista, as she had visited both before writing her novel.

Camulos became the most accepted "Home of Ramona" due to several factors. The description of Moreno Ranch is similar to the historic Rancho Camulos. Influential writers, such as George Wharton James and Charles Fletcher Lummis, avowed that it was so. When the Southern Pacific Railroad opened its main Ventura County line in 1887, it had a stop at Camulos. With the company engaged in a rate war, the trip to Camulos became relatively easy and affordable for visitors. Finally, the Del Valle family of Camulos welcomed tourists: they exploited the association in marketing their products, labeling their oranges and wine as "The Home of Ramona" brand.

In contrast, Guajome did not publicly become associated with Ramona until a 1894 article in Rural Californian made the claim. However, as the house was nearly four miles (6 km) from the nearest Santa Fe Railroad station, getting there was not so easy. Additionally, the Couts family, who owned the property, was not eager to have flocks of tourists on the grounds, possibly due to a falling out between author Jackson and Senora Couts.

Estudillo House in Old Town San Diego is identified as "Ramona's Marriage Place"; the novel said briefly that Ramona was married in San Diego. Although no record existed of Jackson's having visited there, this house became a popular tourist destination. This status continued for years. Estudillo House was unique in marketing solely in terms of Ramona-related tourism. The caretaker sold pieces of the house to tourists, which hastened its deterioration. In 1907, the new owner John D. Spreckels hired architect Hazel Wood Waterman to remodel the house to more closely match descriptions in the novel. When the reconstruction was completed in 1910, the building reopened as a full-fledged Ramona tourist attraction. Estudillo House's application for National Historic Landmark status was entitled "Casa Estudillo/Ramona's Marriage Place".

Other notable Ramona landmarks included "Ramona's Birthplace", a small adobe near Mission San Gabriel Arcángel, and the grave of Ramona Lubo on the Ramona Band of Cahuilla Indians reservation. Writer George Wharton James called Lubo the "real Ramona". Her life bore some resemblance to that of the fictional Ramona. Sixteen years after Lubo's death, in 1938, local people erected a "Ramona monument" at her gravesite.

The Ramona Pageant was a play adapted from the novel. It was staged outdoors, beginning in 1923 in Hemet. The pageant has been held there annually since.

Most historians believe that the fictional Moreno Ranch is an amalgamation of various locations and was not intended to represent a single place. As Carey McWilliams said in his book Southern California Country (1946):

Picture postcards, by the tens of thousands, were published showing "the schools attended by Ramona," "the original of Ramona," "the place where Ramona was married," and various shots of the "Ramona Country." [...] It was not long before the scenic postcards depicting the Ramona Country had come to embrace all of Southern California.

Because of the novel's extraordinary popularity, public perception merged fact and fiction. California historian Walton Bean wrote:

These legends became so ingrained in the culture of Southern California that they were often mistaken for realities. In later years many who visited "Ramona's birthplace" in San Diego or the annual "Ramona Pageant" at Hemet (eighty miles north of San Diego) were surprised and disappointed if they chanced to learn that Ramona was a (fictional) novel rather than a biography.

The novel contributed to the unique cultural identity of Southern California and the whole of the Southwest. The architecture of the missions had recently gained national exposure, and local restoration projects were just beginning. Railroad lines to Southern California were just opening and, combined with the emotions stirred by the novel, the region suddenly gained national attention. Mission Revival Style architecture became popular from about 1890 to 1915. Many examples still stand throughout California and other southwest areas.

== Adaptations ==
Ramona has been adapted several times for other media. The first was a silent film by the same name, released in 1910. It was directed by D. W. Griffith and starred Mary Pickford. Other versions were made in 1928, 1936 and 1946.

- Ramona (1910 film), a 17-minute short directed by D. W. Griffith
- Ramona (1916 film), directed by Donald Crisp
- Ramona (1928 film), directed by Edwin Carewe, featuring Dolores del Río and Warner Baxter
- Ramona (1936 film), directed by Henry King, featuring Loretta Young and Don Ameche
- Ramona (1946 film), directed by Víctor Urruchúa
- Screen Guild Theater, 1945 radio broadcast
- Ramona (2000 TV series), a Mexican telenovela
- The Ramona Pageant, an annual outdoor play, has been performed annually since 1923 in Hemet, California. The Ramona Pageant is the largest and longest-running outdoor play in the United States. It is the official state play of the State of California.

== See also ==
- California Genocide
- Spanish missions in California
