= Gerald Clarke (artist) =

Native American sculptor from California, U.S. (born 1967)

- Born: Gerald Clarke; February 24, 1967 (age 59); Hemet, California
- Citizenship: Cahuilla Band of Mission Indians of the Cahuilla Reservation and U.S.
- Education: BA University of Central Arkansas; MFA Stephen F. Austin State University
- Known for: Painting, Sculpture, conceptual, installation
- Website: geraldclarkeart.com

Gerald Clarke (born February 24, 1967) is a sculptor, installation, and conceptual artist from the Cahuilla Band of Mission Indians. His work often reflects on and questions current issues in Native America and the United States, as well as his personal life. He was the Teresa and Byron Pollitt Endowed Term Professor for Interdisciplinary Research and Learning at the University of California, Riverside.

== Background ==
=== Early life ===
Clarke was born in Hemet, California in 1967, to Carol and Gerald Clarke Sr.

=== Higher education ===
Clarke worked as a welder, and married Stacy Brown. In 1991 he graduated University of Central Arkansas with a Bachelor of Arts in painting and sculpture and a Master of Arts in 1994 from Stephen F. Austin State University.

=== Current life ===
Clarke creates his own work, teaches art at Idyllwild Arts Academy, and runs a storage business with wife Stacy. He is a professor at the University of California, Riverside.

== Fine art career ==
=== Artist statement ===
There are aspects of my work that have evolved over the past thirty years of art making, but some aspects have remained the same. I have consistently chosen to not have a singular approach to art making; I choose whatever media, format or action that I believe would best express the idea/emotion/concept I am exploring.

I also recognize my need for meaning. While I have a deep appreciation for the aesthetic object and truly enjoy the physicality and craft of making an art object, my ultimate goal as an artist is for my work to have a meaningful interaction with the viewer.

In hindsight, I recognize how my perspective of the viewer has evolved. Early in my career, I sought to educate the non-native viewer about contemporary Native culture. Over time, I came to two realizations regarding my work and the viewer. First, by focusing my efforts to educate the non-native viewer, I was neglecting my own tribal community. Second, the more personal and honest I am in my work, the more universal it becomes.

I was raised with a traditional understanding of the world and the importance of community. I feel a responsibility to share my perspective and the humanity we all share. I don’t make Native American art. I express my Cahuilla perspective as a 21st Century citizen of the world and the passion, pain, and reverence I feel as a contemporary Cahuilla person.

-Gerald Clarke, 2023

=== Traditional influences ===
A traditional art form of the Cahuilla people, basketry is not only a community, but a family tradition for Clarke. While his artworks do not utilize the same materials as seen in traditional basket making, he sees his creation process as similar to theirs: "Cahuilla basket makers go out and gather materials, and they put them together to produce something that is both functional and aesthetic. I kind of do my work the same way. I go out and I gather these things. I combine them."

== Major works and themes ==
Clarke's work is often politically minded, reflecting on current and past issues taking place in Indian Country, California, the United States as a whole, and within his personal life.

...through art, I can come to an understanding of myself, my community and the world around me. - Gerald Clarke

=== Contemporary Native America ===
In 1996 Clarke created Artifacts, a collection of four shovels with the blades down, meant to be leaned against a wall. The top handles are wrapped in colored ribbons: black, green, red and yellow, colors indicative of the American Indian community. Writing, in black marker, travels around the handle, until the top of the blade. The four shovels represent his father and one for his three aunts, who are represented on their own shovel by a photograph affixed before the blade. A cattle brand is welded into each shovel blade, like those found on Clarke's family ranch. His goal with Artifacts is to show how one can dig up the past to reveal American Indians in the world today.

In 2009 Clarke's solo show "One Tract Mind" looked at the effects of tract housing on Native communities in Southern California. In this show Clarke experimented heavily in digital art as well as other mixed media forms looking at water rights, the preservation of sacred sites, and the opposition by Native communities to the invasion of suburbia.

==== Road signs ====
Myaamionki at the Eiteljorg Museum

In 2001 Clarke started to create road signs to be displayed along roads on the Cahuilla reservation and near his family's ranch entrance. These road signs show words in the Cahuilla language:

- Nesun e' elquish - I am sad
- Nextaxmuqa - I am singing
- Kimul Hakushwe - The door is open
- Ivawen - Be strong

The signs, welcomed by the community, eventually disappeared off the side of the road, plucked off by vandals or road side collectors. Clarke sought to remind his own tribal members that they are valuable to this world.

When Clarke was rewarded an Eiteljorg Fellowship, from the Eiteljorg Museum of American Indians and Western Art, in 2007 he created three signs relevant to the Miami people, connecting with the Miami Nation of Indians in Indiana. Working with Miami artist and historian Scott Shoemaker the three pieces were installed on the museum grounds where they reside to this day:

- Myaamionki - Place of the Miami
- Oonseentia - Yellow poplar tree
- Seekaahkwiaanki - We held on to the tree limbs

=== A wider world ===
Examining not only Native America today, Clarke also looks at the current state of affairs in the United States and beyond. In the video and installation artwork Task (2002 and 2007) he is shown "ironing out the wrinkles that plague our world" in response to September 11, 2001, which he describes as his own type of healing ritual, a ritual and experience that caused him to question the future that his own children would face and how the creation of fine art and freedom of speech is an intricate part to the healing of the United States through this fragile time.

=== Native American art and authenticity ===
The question of authenticity is a frequent discussion in art markets where Native American art is the emphasis. Another connection to his family cattle ranch, Clarke created two works to discuss the topic of authenticity: To the Discriminating Collector in 2002 and Branded in 2006. Creating a branding iron that spells out "INDIAN", To the Discriminating Collector sets aim at collectors that put their stamp of "Indian" on artworks and creators they deem worthy of the term, allowing them to brand books, clothing, films, objects, religion "Indian" with one stamp of the branding iron. He followed up the branding iron with using it, burning the branding into a white sheet of paper. Conceptually the work is simple yet the meaning is meant to question the lack of authenticity that Native American art collectors find in conceptual art by contemporary artists. Many of these collectors seek traditional art forms as a valid form of Native art, while contemporary artists are placed on the back burner in collections and Indian markets.

Performance pieces and other conceptual installation works further to examine Indian markets throughout the country. Native Americans, specifically writers and religious figures, have often been sought by non-Native people to provide guidance and wisdom not often found in traditional Western religions. Artworks such as 1998's Indian Wisdom and Manifest Destiny is an installation piece featuring two gumball machines: Manifest Destiny which is covered in fabric displaying the flag of the United States and a white cowboy hat and Indian Wisdom which is covered in fabric reminiscent of Southwestern Indian blankets, and features a picture of Clarke stating "Indian Wisdom" in it. Clarke describes it as his own form of selling out and while the gumball machines display containers filled dollar bills, which only cost a mere 25 cents to obtain, the purchaser actually receives a print out with politically minded statements on the back.

Performance pieces such as Extreme Makeover and Antiques Road Show depict Clark questioning Native American stereotypes, the "whitening" of Native peoples by Europeans, and further exploration into authenticity of being a "real Indian."

=== Diabetes and alcoholism ===
Diabetes and alcoholism are serious factors of reservation life for many Native communities. Responding to the unhealthy social conditions Clark created Continuum Basket (2002); a large wall sculpture that shows the spiraling technique traditional in Cahuilla basketry, it is made of beer and soda cans.

== Museum collections ==
- Agua Caliente Cultural Museum, Riverside County, California
- Eiteljorg Museum of American Indians and Western Art, Indianapolis, Indiana
- Heard Museum, Phoenix, Arizona
- Palm Springs Art Museum, Palm Springs, California
- Autry Museum of the American West, Los Angeles, CA
- Riverside Museum, Riverside, CA
- City of Palm Desert, Palm Desert, CA

== Awards ==
- Eiteljorg Fellowship for Native American Fine Art, 2007, Eiteljorg Museum of American Indians and Western Art 2007
- Artist Fellowship, James Phelan Fund of the San Francisco Foundation for California-Born Artists. 2016
- Harpo Foundation Artist Fellowship, Vermont Studio Center, Johnson, VT. 2016
- Mentor Artist Fellowship, Native Arts and Culture Foundation, Vancouver, WA 2020
- Dragonfly Award, Dorothy Ramon Learning Center, Banning, CA
- Joan Mitchell Foundation Fellowship, 2025

== See also ==
- List of Native American artists
- Visual arts by indigenous peoples of the Americas

== Bibliography ==
- Dubin, Margaret and Sylvia Ross. The Dirt Is Red Here: Art and Poetry from Native California. Heydey Books, 2002. ISBN 1-890771-54-6 A collection of poems by notable Native writers and images by emerging Native artists.
- Owen, Sean. Borderlands: Gerald Clarke, Cahuilla Artist Crossing the Line. 2005. ISBN 978-0-8026-0694-5 Documentary about Clarke's work and includes the performance pieces Antiques Road Show and Extreme Makeover.
- Editors: Christine Giles, Christine and Evans Frantz, David. Gerald Clarke: Falling Rock. Publisher: Hirmer Verlag and Palm Springs Art Museum 2020. ISBN 3777434493 Exhibition Catalog
