= Muut =

Cahuilla folklore figure

Muut was the personification and messenger of death in the culture of the Native American Cahuilla people of southern California and northern Mexico, and was usually depicted as an owl or as the unseen hooting of owls. He was one of the most active and vividly remembered of the nukatem, a special classification of beings who were created by Mukat, the Creator figure, in the 'beginning.' Death was considered a necessary part of life by the Cahuilla, and thus Muut was seen as more of a psychopomp than a frightening grim reaper character. This role was assigned by Mukat, who argued that overpopulation would have dire consequences.

== Popular Culture ==
Muut is also a prominent secondary character in the webcomic Gunnerkrigg Court, having known the main character Antimony Carver prior to her entrance to the school. His character is also used to introduce other psychopomps.
