= Amanda Augustine =

Chairperson of the Augustine Band of Cahuilla Indians
- Incumbent
- Assumed office 2016
- Preceded by: Mary Ann Green

Personal details
- Born: Amanda Augustine Vance; 1986 or 1987 (age 39–40)
- Children: 6
- Parent: Mary Ann Green (mother)
- Education: Capella University

Amanda Augustine Vance (born 1986/1987) is an American tribal leader and business executive serving as chairperson of the Augustine Band of Cahuilla Indians since 2016.

== Early life and education ==
Augustine was born in 1986 or 1987 to Mary Ann Green. She lived with her siblings in Los Angeles County, California until moving with their mother to the then-abandoned Augustine Reservation in Coachella Valley in the late 1980s. They grew up in trailers on the reservation. She is of mixed Black and Indigenous ancestry and is enrolled member of the Augustine Band of Cahuilla Indians. As children, her family learned of their tribal history and customs through elders in other nearby tribes.

Augustine earned a M.S. in psychology specializing in industrial and organizational psychology from Capella University in 2022. She completed a second master's degree in Indigenous people's law.

== Career ==
Following the standup of the organic farm, Temalpakh on the reservation in 2012, Augustine established a small farm board to oversee its growth on the reservation. Her husband is the board administrator and provides oversight of day-to-day operations. When her mother and tribal chairperson became ill with cancer, Augustine began serving as vice chairperson. In 2016, she succeeded her mother.

In February 2021, Augustine became interim chief executive officer of Synergy Blue, a gaming equipment provider that is majority owned by her tribe. She succeeded Georg Washington. Augustine assumed the role permanently in March.

As of 2023, Augustine remains the tribal chairperson. Other members of the tribal council include her cousins Victoria and Geramy Martin who serve as the vice chairperson and secretary respectively and her siblings William and Amanda who are a council member and treasurer respectively. They manage the business holdings of the tribe. This includes the Augustine Casino, Cahuilla Ranch, and Temalpakh Farm. Augustine was nominated for a 2026 Constellation Award during Women's History Month for her tribal leadership.

== Personal life ==
Augustine is married to Jerrelle Williams. She has six children including triplets.

== See also ==
- Black women in American politics
- List of Native American politicians
- Native American women in politics
