= George Wharton James =

American lecturer, photographer and journalist (1858–1923)

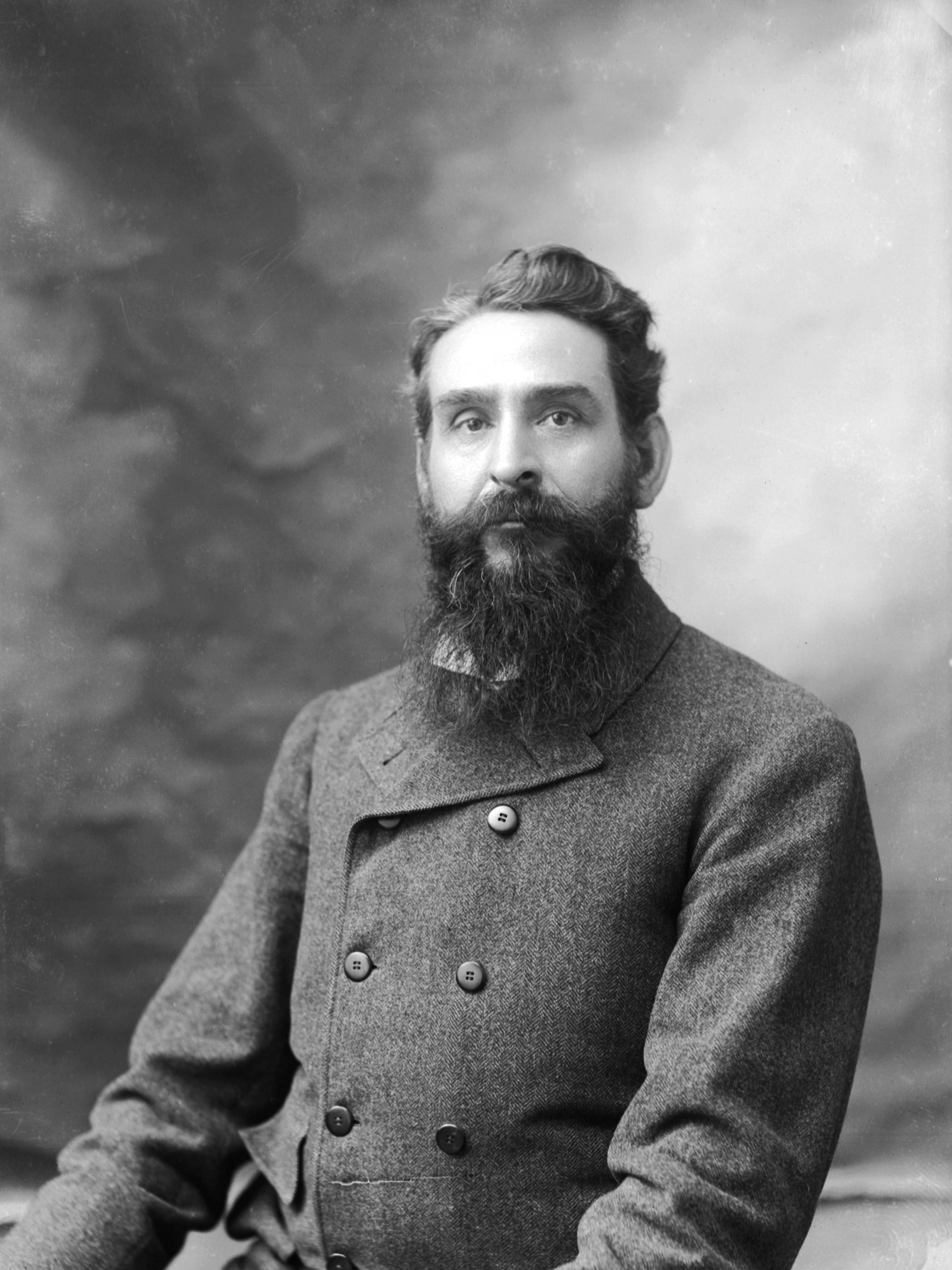
- Born: 27 September 1858; Lincolnshire, England
- Died: 1923 (aged 64–65)
- Occupations: lecturer, photographer, journalist
- Writing career
- Subjects: California and the American Southwest

George Wharton James (27 September 1858 – 8 November 1923 was an American popular lecturer, photographer, journalist and editor. Born in Lincolnshire, England, he emigrated to the United States as a young man after being ordained as a Methodist minister.

He served in parishes in Nevada and Southern California, gradually beginning his journalism and writing career. An editor of two magazines, he also wrote more than 40 books and many articles and pamphlets on California and the American Southwest.

== Biography ==
George Wharton James was born in Lincolnshire, England. He married and was ordained as a Methodist minister. He and his wife immigrated to the United States in 1881.

He served in parishes in Nevada and southern California. However, in 1889 his wife sued for divorce, accusing him of committing numerous acts of adultery. He was tried by the Methodist Church, charged with real estate fraud, using faked credentials, and sexual misconduct. He was defrocked, although he was later reinstated.

In addition to writing his own books, James was associate editor of The Craftsman (1904–05), and editor of Out West (1912–14). In the style of the times, he was a popular lecturer in the region. He also lectured at both the Panama-Pacific and Panama-California expositions 1915–16.

James had a long-running feud with Charles Fletcher Lummis, a California writer with similar regional interests. Both men also explored the American Southwest, becoming acquainted with Father Anton Docher, a French-born missionary priest who served at Pueblo of Isleta in New Mexico for 34 years.

James's books included the well-received The Wonders of the Colorado Desert (1906), Through Ramona's Country (1909), In and Out of the Old Missions of California (1905), and The Lake of the Sky (1915). Characteristics of his writing included romanticism, an enthusiasm for natural environments, the idealization of aboriginal lifeways, and the promotion of health fads.

After his divorce, James married again, living in Pasadena, California with his second wife at 1098 North Raymond Avenue. Writer Lawrence Clark Powell later described James's home as serving as "a kind of museum salon in the same way that El Alisal served as the center for his rival booster Lummis' Los Angeles followers. He founded the Pasadena Browning Society and the Anti-Whispering Society. According to Powell, the Anti-Whispering Society was "devoted to the suppression of (1) talking audiences, (2) peanut fiends, and (3) crying babies."

James was an advocate of outdoor nakedness or nudism.

== Honors ==
- His books and pamphlets were collected by the California State Library and the University of California, Berkeley.
- A collection of his photographs is on file at the University of New Mexico.
- The Southwest Museum in Los Angeles has some of his papers and photographs.
- The Huntington Library in San Marino, CA has some of his papers and photographs.
- The University of Nevada, Reno in Reno, NV has some of his papers and photographs.

== Bibliography ==
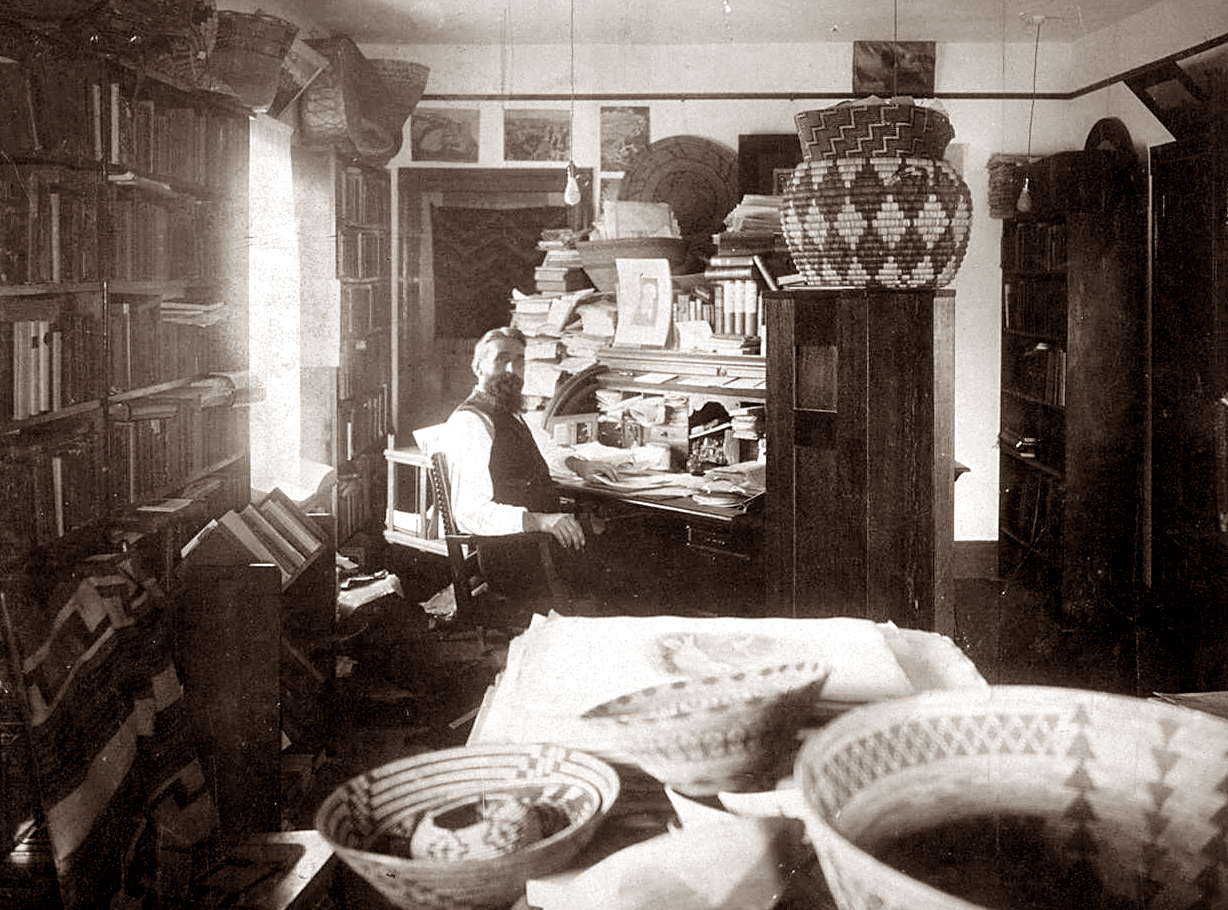
George Wharton James in his workshop.

- The Wonders of the Colorado Desert. Boston: Little, Brown, and Company. 1906. OCLC 3313620. LCC F868.S15 J2 (with illustrations by Carl Eytel)
- Indian basketry. Henry Malkan. 1909. ISBN 0-486-21712-4.
- Through Ramona's Country. Little, Brown. 1909. OCLC 1710960.
- Indian Blankets and Their Makers. A.C. McClurg and Co. 1914. ISBN 0-486-22996-3.
- The Story of Captain, the Horse with the Human Brain. Radiant Life Press, Pasadena. 1917.
- The Old Franciscan Missions of California (Illustrated ed.). The echo library. 2009. ISBN 978-1-4068-2950-1.
- The Lake of the Sky. The echo library. 2009. ISBN 978-1-4068-2952-5.
- The Grand Canyon of Arizona: How to See It. The echo library. 2009. ISBN 978-1-4068-5328-5.
- In and Out of the Old Missions of California. 2003. ISBN 978-0766142237.
- Quit Your Worrying!. The Echo Library. 2009. ISBN 978-1-4068-5330-8.
- Indian Basketry, and How to Make Indian and Other Baskets. BiblioBazaar. 2011. ISBN 978-1-178-58712-8.
- New Mexico, the Land of the Delight Makers. The Page Company. 1929. ASIN B008LH6ZN0.
- The Legend of Tauquitch and Algoot. Forgotten Books. 2008. ISBN 978-1605068480.
