= Cahuilla Band of Indians =

Native Cahuilla Indians in Southern California

Cahuilla Band of Cahuilla Indians
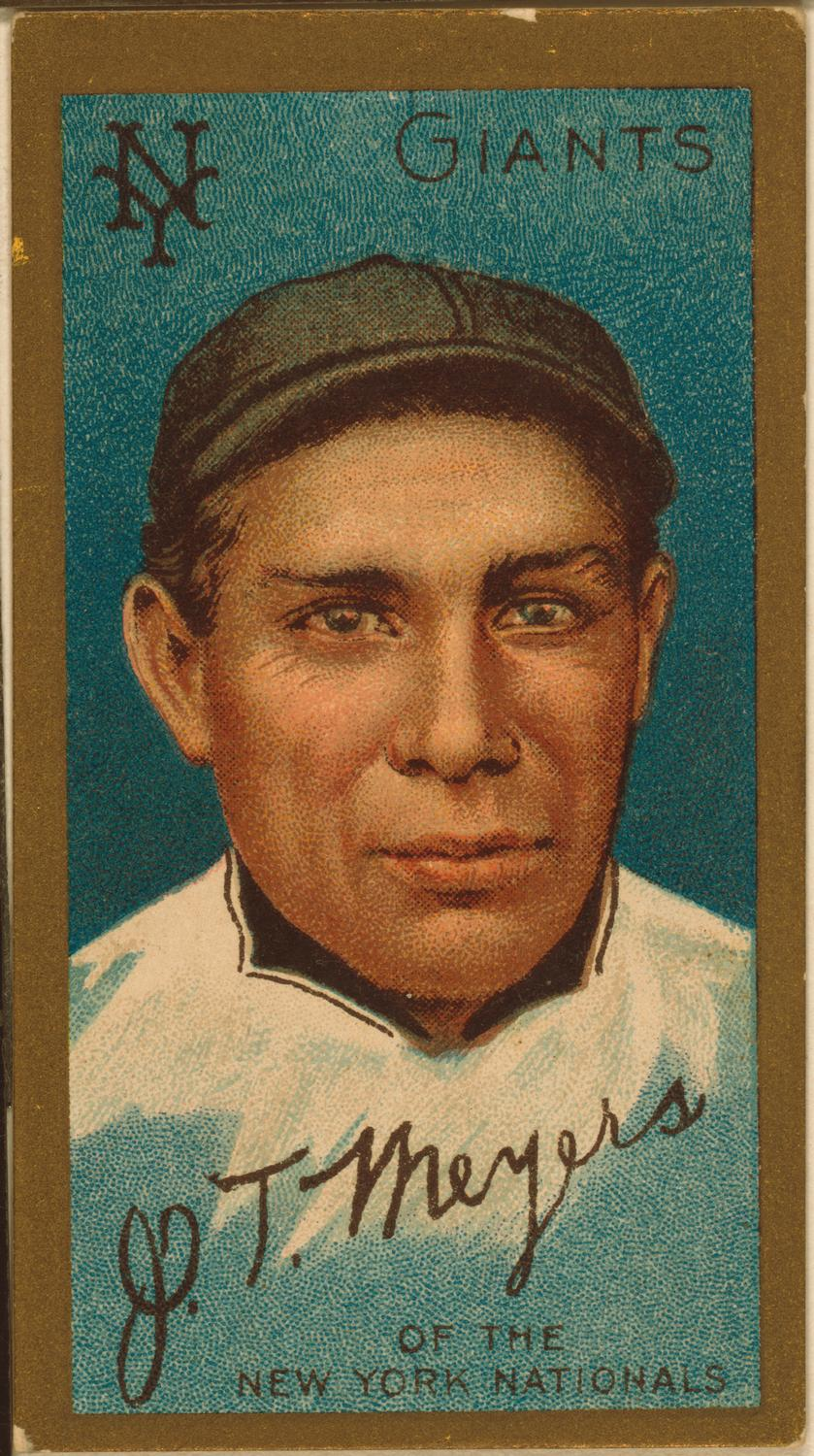
- John Tortes "Chief" Meyers, Major League Baseball catcher and tribal member

Total population
- 154 (est.)

Regions with significant populations
- United States (California)

Languages
- English, Cahuilla language

Religion
- Indigenous religion, Christianity (Roman Catholicism)

Related ethnic groups
- Cahuilla tribes

The Cahuilla Band of Indians is a federally recognized tribe of Cahuilla people located in Southern California. They were formerly the Cahuilla Band of Cahuilla Indians of the Cahuilla Reservation.

The tribe originally came from Coachella Valley, through San Gorgonio Pass, to the San Jacinto Mountains. In 1875, they were relocated to present-day Anza, California.

== Reservation ==
The Cahuilla Reservation (33°31′13″N 116°42′42″W) is located in Riverside County near the town of Anza. The reservation includes Cahuilla, California, where the Cahuilla Casino is located. The reservation is 18,884 acres (76.42 km^{2}), with 16,884 acres (68.33 km^{2}) owned by individual tribe members. Two thousand (8.1 km^{2}) belong to the entire tribe in common. The reservation was first established in 1875 by Executive Order.

== Government ==
The Cahuilla Band of Cahuilla Indians is headquartered in Anza, CA. They are governed by a democratically elected tribal council with five members serving four-year staggered terms. Their current council is Erica Schenk (chairwoman, seated 2024), Edward Chacon (vice-chairman, seated 2022), Steven Leash Jr. (secretary, seated 2022), BobbyRay Esparza (council member, seated 2022), and Samantha Thornsberry (council member, seated 2024).

== Economic development ==
The tribe owns the Cahuilla Casino, which first opened in 1996, and Mountain Sky Travel Center, a convenience store and gas station that opened in 2015. Both are located in Cahuilla, CA, with addresses in nearby Anza. Following a delay caused by the COVID-19 pandemic, the tribe opened a new casino and hotel in May 2020 in Anza, CA, thereby replacing the old casino.

== Notable tribal members ==
- Chief Meyers (1880–1971), professional baseball player
- Gerald Clarke (1967–), artist and professor

== Culture and traditions ==
The Cahuilla tribe's origin story starts with two brothers, Mukat and Tamaoit, who help create the world. They created the skies, the sea, and the rules that governed the land, but each had a different idea in mind when creating the image of a human. Tamaoit took his creation of man and went to the underworld, while Mukat stayed above ground. However, some of Mukat's creations were burned, and they scattered to different parts of the globe, each speaking a different language. Only one man spoke the same language as Mukat, so Mukat named this man the first ancestor of the Cahuilla. During this time, Mukat also created a path to the afterlife, where the path was surrounded by moving hills. When people died, the good people could pass onto the afterlife; the bad people would be crushed by the moving hills and transformed into small creatures, such as insects.

The Cahuilla Band's language is derived from the Uto-Aztecan language. According to a 1990 census, only around 35 speakers of the original language remained at the time. Now, the tribe's people pass down their language and culture through various songs, games, and stories. One of these song traditions is bird singing, where multiple tribes gather to sing different songs. Before, it was also used to help people find potential marriage partners, but now it is used to gather old friends and relatives. Another prominent tradition is basket weaving, where people gather to weave different baskets; here, the older generation passes down millennia-old traditions to the younger generation. Another prominent tradition is their funeral ceremony, where they bury their loved ones and sing songs all night. The funeral lasts seven days, and close relatives of the deceased are not allowed to participate in joyful traditions (such as dancing) for a year.

== Bibliography ==
- Eargle, Jr., Dolan H. California Indian Country: The Land and the People. San Francisco: Tree Company Press, 1992. ISBN 0-937401-20-X.
- Pritzker, Barry M. A Native American Encyclopedia: History, Culture, and Peoples. Oxford: Oxford University Press, 2000. ISBN 978-0-19-513877-1.
