= Agua Caliente Cultural Museum =

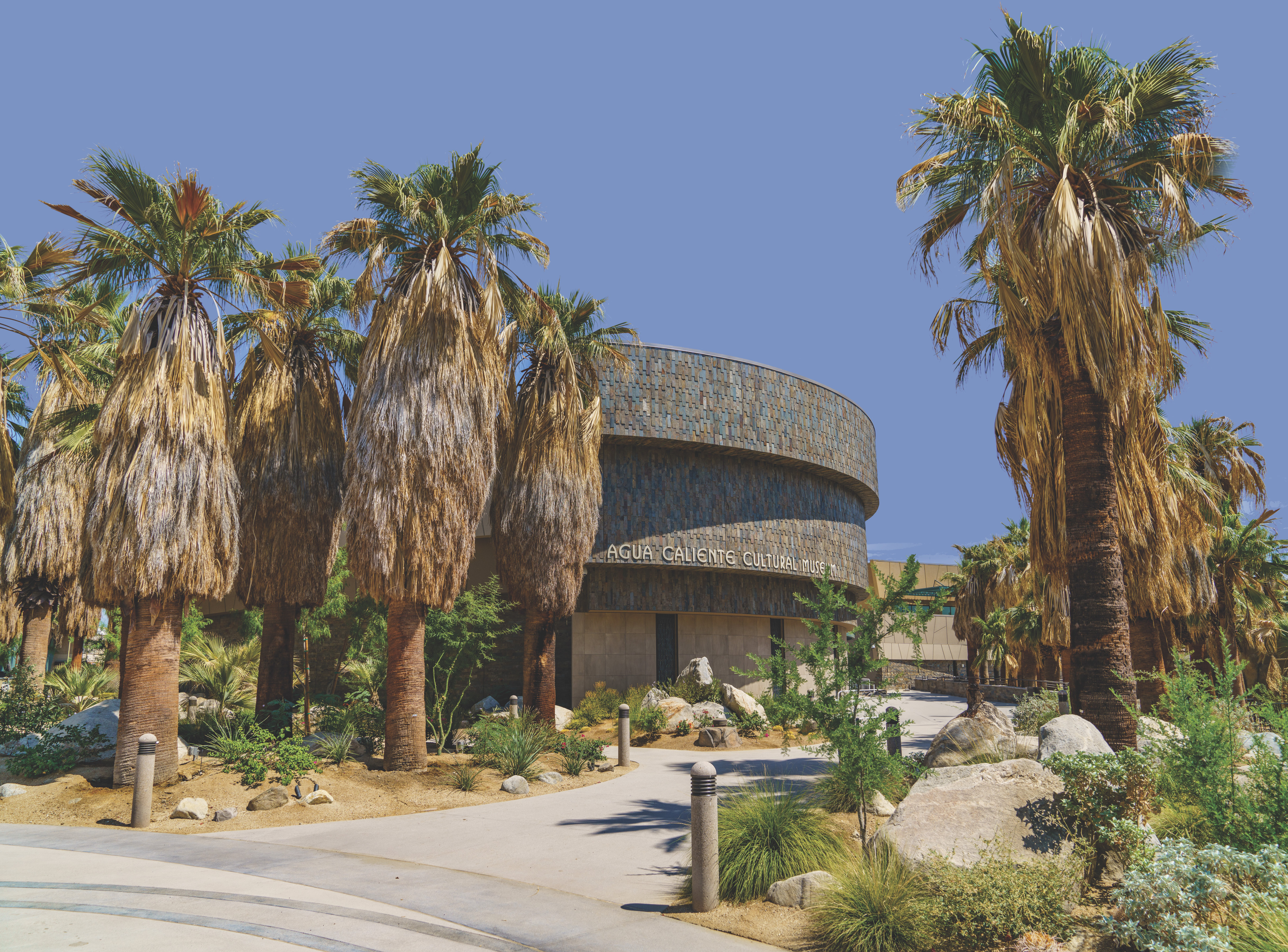
- Established: 1991
- Location: 140 N. Indian Canyon Dr., Palm Springs, California
- Coordinates: 33.82096°N 116.54723°W
- Type: Anthropology museum
- Director: Steven Karr
- Curators: Angela Barker, MFA : Head of Collections & Curatorial
- Public transit access: SunLine Transit; Lines 111, 30, 14
- Website: www.accmuseum.org

The Agua Caliente Cultural Museum is a culture and history museum located in Palm Springs, California, United States, focusing on the Agua Caliente Band of Cahuilla Indians of the Coachella Valley.

== History ==
The museum was established in 1991.

== Exhibits ==
=== Collections ===
Among the collections of the museum are:

- Off-site Exhibitions – the museum sponsors exhibits at various institutions. Presently exhibits are at:
  - Spa Resort Casino Hotel Lobby (Palm Springs) on the spiritual Wahaatukicnikic Tetayaw (Blue Frog) living at the Agua Caliente Hot Spring
  - California State University San Bernardino, Palm Desert Campus about Native Americans competing in sports
  - Palm Springs City Hall, showing major milestones and events of Cahuilla people history
- Core exhibitions
  - Cahuilla Culture and History
  - The Florence Patencio Collection, about a significant cultural leader of the community
- Online exhibitions
- Featured exhibitions

== Operations ==
=== Ownership ===
The Agua Caliente Band of Cahuilla Indians sponsors the museum.

=== Location ===
The museum is located at 140 North Indian Canyon Drive (downtown Palm Springs) between Andreas Road and Tahquitz Canyon Way. Public transportation via SunLine Transit is available on lines 111, 30 and 14. Administrative offices and a 1,200 volume reference library are at 901 East Tahquitz Canyon Way, Suite C-204, Palm Springs, CA 92262.

=== Publications ===
- The Spirit

=== Affiliations ===
The museum is the first Native American museum to be part of the Smithsonian Institution Affiliations Program.

=== Activities and recognition ===
The museum participates in the American Alliance of Museums (AAM) Museum Assessment Program; and it received a first-place award in the AAM 2010 Publications Design Competition for its 2009–2010 Museum Program Brochure and Program Announcement Cards (designed by JCRR Design).

It also collaborates with the UCLA/Getty's Masters Program.

=== Future plans ===
The museum is fundraising for expansion into a 100,000 square foot facility designed by architects Jones & Jones.
