= Anza, California =

Anza
- Census-designated place
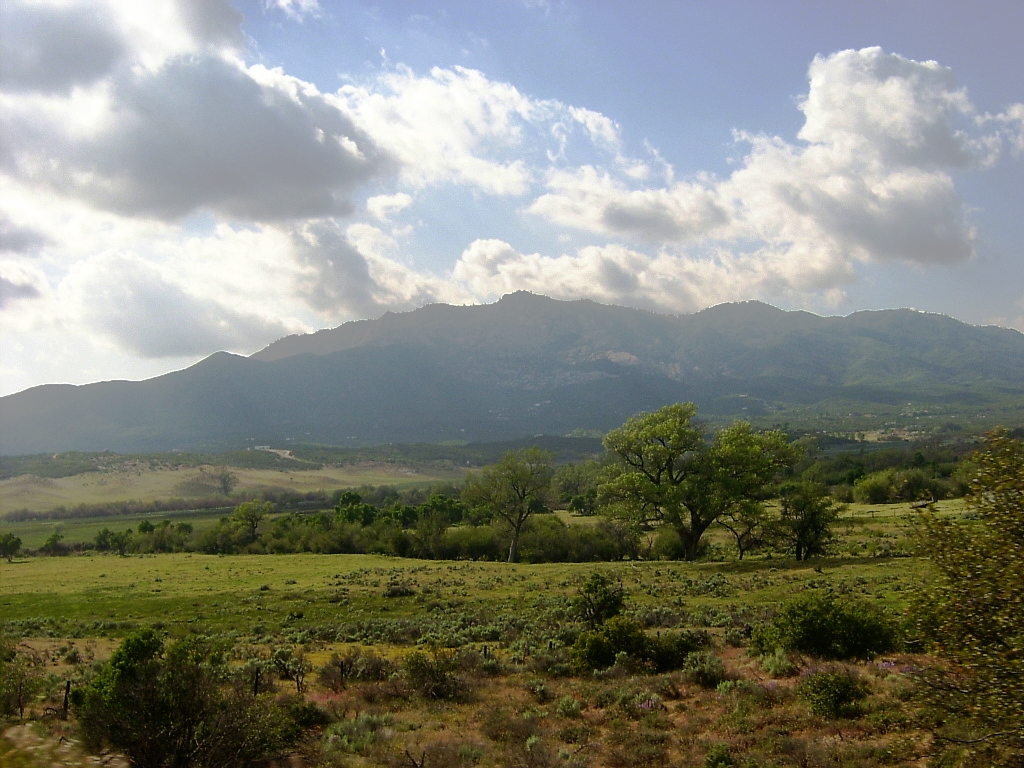
- Anza, California, View of the Cahuilla mountains from Cahuilla road

- Location of Anza in Riverside County, California.

- Location within the state of California Anza (the United States)
- Coordinates: 33°33′18″N 116°40′25″W
- Country: United States
- State: California
- County: Riverside

Area
  - Total: 27.68 sq mi (71.68 km^{2})
  - Land: 27.59 sq mi (71.47 km^{2})
  - Water: 0.081 sq mi (0.21 km^{2}) 0.30%
- Elevation: 3,921 ft (1,195 m)

Population (2020)
  - Total: 3,075
  - Density: 111.4/sq mi (43.02/km^{2})
- Time zone: UTC-8 (Pacific (PST))
  - Summer (DST): UTC-7 (PDT)
- ZIP codes: 92539
- Area code: 951
- FIPS code: 06-02294
- GNIS feature ID: 269555; 2582935
- Website: anza-valley.com

Anza is a census-designated place in Riverside County, California, in the Anza Valley, a semi-arid region at a mean elevation of 3,921 feet (1,195 m) above sea level. It is located 13 miles (21 km) south of Idyllwild, 32 miles (51 km) east-northeast of Temecula, 40 miles (64 km) southwest of Palm Springs, and 90 miles (140 km) northeast of San Diego, being traversed by State Route 371. Anza is on the Pacific Crest Trail and the Juan Bautista de Anza National Historic Trail. The population was 3,075 at the 2020 census.

Locally, Anza and several other mountain communities (including Garner Valley, Idyllwild, Pinyon Pines and Aguanga) are collectively referred to as "the Hill."

The ZIP code is 92539, and the community is inside area code 951.

== History ==
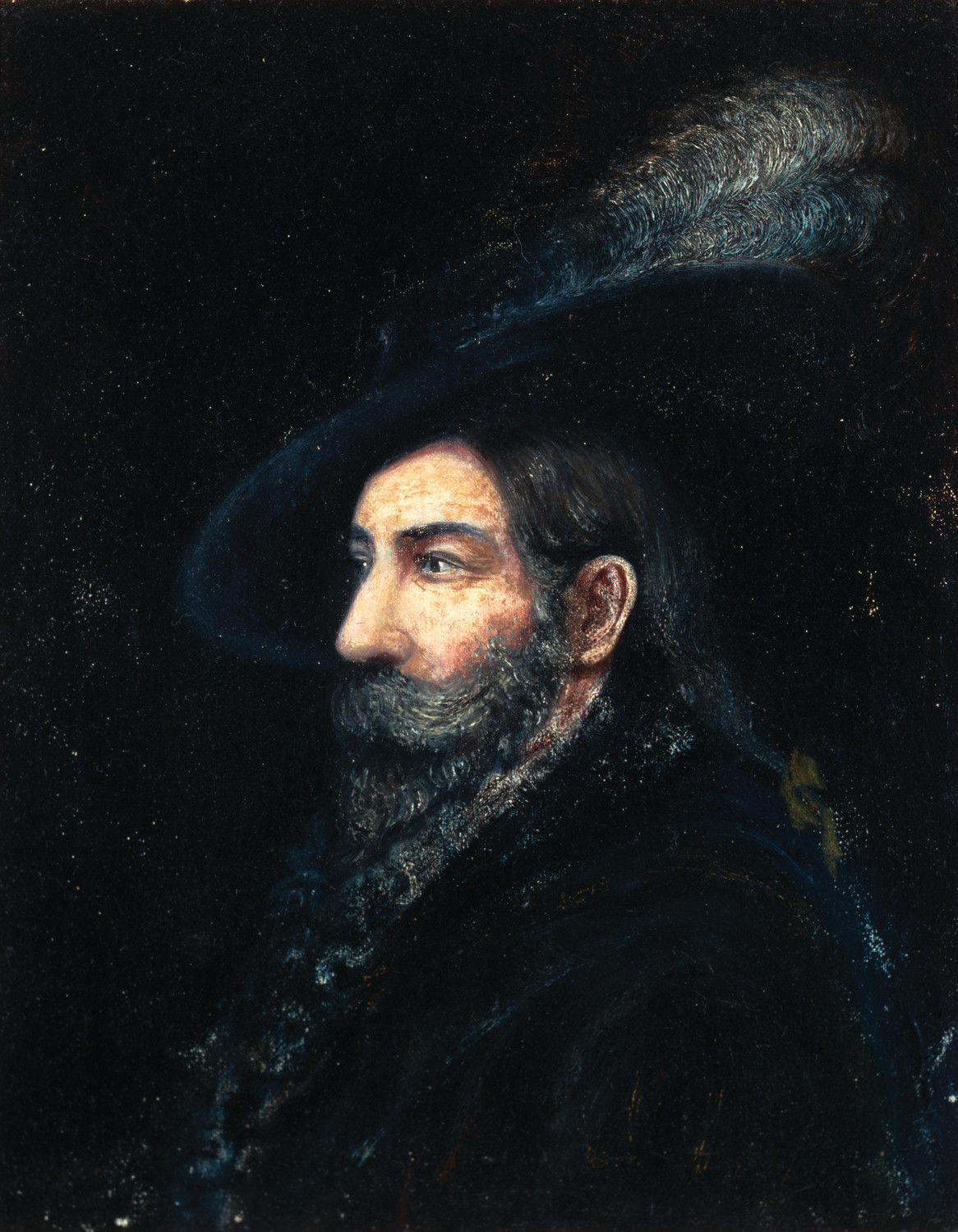
Anza is named after Juan Bautista de Anza, a Spanish officer who led the Anza expeditions into California.

It is estimated that the Cahuilla aboriginal tribes inhabited an area including what is today the Anza Valley more than two thousand years ago and encountered Europeans only as late as 1774, when a Spanish expedition in search of an overland route from Sonora to Alta California made its way from Tubac, Sonora through the valley to Monterey, Alta California. Explorer Juan Bautista de Anza first passed through the valley on March 16, 1774, and again on December 27, 1775. De Anza originally named the valley "San Carlos"; it was renamed in his honor from Cahuilla Valley to Anza Valley on September 16, 1926.

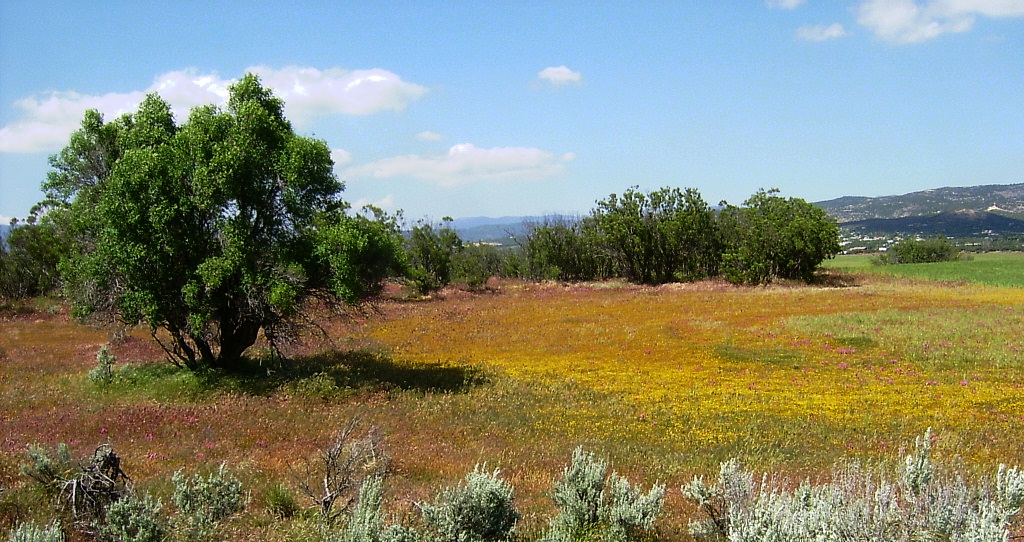
Spring blooms, Anza, California

Up until about 1580 the area was in the proximity of a larger body of inland water known as Lake Cahuilla, but that inland lake larger than the current Salton Sea, which occupies a portion of its former location, evaporated, thus increasing the desert character of the Anza Valley. During the 19th century, settlement included ranchers, a limited number of miners, and honey producers. The mid-to-late 19th century witnessed moderate population and above average economic prosperity for this isolated community.

From the late 1860s on, Anza was largely settled by families seeking to build ranches under the Homestead Act. Of the homesteads in the area, one, the Cary Ranch on Cary Road (south of Anza, east of the Tripp Flats Ranger Station) still exists and is still owned and occupied by family members of the original settlers. The ranch is now occupied by the Hopkins family. The Hopkins are direct descendants of the Cary family. Although the Cary Ranch used to encompass hundreds of acres of land, most has been sold off, and only a 20-acre (81,000 m^{2}) parcel and several original buildings exist.

The post office opened in 1926.

Already in the 1970s sales of property parcels and lots in Anza were promoted with particular emphasis on the proximity of the unspoiled countryside to larger coastal cities of southern California. Though perceived by outsiders as friendly and open to newcomers, Anza has been determined to avoid the social and environmental problems of over-urbanization, and since the 1980s the community has sought to preserve its unique artistic and creative culture by closely scrutinizing any development plans that could give rise to dysfunctions experienced in other regions of the state.

== Geography ==
According to the United States Census Bureau, the CDP covers an area of 27.7 square miles (71.7 km^{2}), 99.7% of it land and 0.3% of it water.

Regional geographic subdivisions of the unincorporated town include Anza Valley and Cave Rocks (Central); Tripp Flats, Chandler Heights and Cahuilla (West) as well as Oak Spring, Burnt Spring and Heller Spring (East). The Anza Valley in which the unincorporated town is nestled is bordered by three significant mountains: Cahuilla Mountain to the west, Thomas Mountain to the northeast and Beauty Mountain to the southwest.

The area is characterized as high desert, experiencing somewhat stronger temperature variations than those of the coastal cities, including sudden dips of temperature even on summer evenings, due to the high elevation. Directly to the north of Anza is the Santa Rosa Mountains, a part of the Peninsular Ranges. The Anza Trail—originally traveled on horseback by Juan Bautista de Anza in 1774 through what was then referred to as the Cahuilla Valley—traverses the community from southeast to northwest.

== Climate ==
According to the Köppen Climate Classification system, Anza has a warm-summer Mediterranean climate. Anza weather can range from warm to hot with common afternoon thunderstorms during summer, to chilly with occasional rain and snow during fall and winter. Its higher 4000 ft elevation at the edge of the mountains makes the weather much cooler and far more variable than the lower surrounding cities with often drastic day-to-day changes.

During the summer months, highs range from the lower 80s to mid 90s with low temperatures in the 50s and 60s. Monsoon thunderstorms are common in the afternoon between July and September when typically 3–6" of rain falls. October high temperatures are in the 60s and 70s with night lows in the 40s and 50s with under .25" of rain. Between November and early December, high temperatures are typically in the lower 50s and 60s with lows in the upper 20s and 30s. Rain doesn't fall often and is usually light, occasionally turning to snow with light dustings. Total rainfall is typically 1" or less.

During winter, typical highs are in the 40s and 50s with overnight lows in the lower 20s and 30s. Precipitation is a varied with rain and snowfall occurring 1–2 days a week. An entire winter typically sees 5–10" of rain and 8–16" of snow with a couple snowfalls of several inches to 1 ft common over the higher east side of town. Snowfall melts quickly in the much warmer daytime temperatures with little tree coverage, although deeper more regular snowpack can found over the upper reaches of town near the treeline at 5000 ft at the border of the San Bernardino National Forest. Spring is brief with any snowfall ending by early April and rain becoming a rarity by May and June with 1–2" of rain falling mostly in March and April.

== Demographics ==
Historical population
Census	Pop.	Note	%±
2010	3,014		—
2020	3,075		2.0%
U.S. Decennial Census; 1860–1870 1880-1890; 1900 1910 1920; 1930 1940 1950; 1960 1970 1980; 1990 2000 2010

Anza first appeared as a census designated place in the 2010 U.S. census.

=== Racial and ethnic composition ===
Anza CDP, California – Racial and ethnic composition Note: the US Census treats Hispanic/Latino as an ethnic category. This table excludes Latinos from the racial categories and assigns them to a separate category. Hispanics/Latinos may be of any race.
Race / Ethnicity (NH = Non-Hispanic)	Pop 2010	Pop 2020	% 2010	% 2020
White alone (NH)	2,034	1,690	67.49%	54.96%
Black or African American alone (NH)	25	24	0.83%	0.78%
Native American or Alaska Native alone (NH)	42	43	1.39%	1.40%
Asian alone (NH)	35	250	1.16%	8.13%
Native Hawaiian or Pacific Islander alone (NH)	3	4	0.10%	0.13%
Other race alone (NH)	9	25	0.30%	0.81%
Mixed race or Multiracial (NH)	75	108	2.49%	3.51%
Hispanic or Latino (any race)	791	931	26.24%	30.28%
Total	3,014	3,075	100.00%	100.00%

=== 2020 census ===
As of the 2020 census, Anza had a population of 3,075 and a population density of 111.4 inhabitants per square mile (43.0/km^{2}). Of the population, 99.8% lived in households and 0.2% lived in non-institutionalized group quarters, while no one was institutionalized. Additionally, 0.0% of residents lived in urban areas and 100.0% lived in rural areas.

The age distribution was 18.5% under the age of 18, 6.5% aged 18 to 24, 21.5% aged 25 to 44, 31.4% aged 45 to 64, and 22.1% aged 65 or older. The median age was 48.1 years. For every 100 females, there were 115.0 males, and for every 100 females age 18 and over, there were 113.8 males age 18 and over.

There were 1,194 households, of which 20.5% had children under the age of 18 living in them. Of all households, 43.8% were married-couple households, 7.1% were cohabiting couple households, 25.9% were households with a male householder and no spouse or partner present, and 23.2% were households with a female householder and no spouse or partner present. About 28.2% of households were made up of individuals, and 15.4% had someone living alone who was 65 years of age or older. The average household size was 2.57. There were 757 families (63.4% of all households).

There were 1,406 housing units at an average density of 51.0 units per square mile (19.7 units/km^{2}). Of these units, 84.9% were occupied and 15.1% were vacant. Of occupied units, 73.9% were owner-occupied and 26.1% were occupied by renters. The homeowner vacancy rate was 2.1% and the rental vacancy rate was 4.8%.

Racial composition as of the 2020 census
Race	Number	Percent
White	1,822	59.3%
Black or African American	30	1.0%
American Indian and Alaska Native	56	1.8%
Asian	255	8.3%
Native Hawaiian and Other Pacific Islander	6	0.2%
Some other race	508	16.5%
Two or more races	398	12.9%

== Culture ==
During the 1990s, the community enjoyed an increasingly widespread reputation as a growing artists colony featuring newcomers from as far away as Europe. Common free-time activities include trail wandering, local historical activities and festivals as well as motorbiking, rockhounding and horseback riding along the Anza Trail. The Mountain Cahuilla operate a casino from their reservation on the southwestern edge of the community.

Every summer, Anza has a parade to celebrate the Fourth of July. This festival is called Anza Days and is celebrated by the whole town, and people travel miles each year to see it.

Anza also has a local gymkhana horseshowing circuit put on by the Lions Club six months out of the year. This is also a popular event the public enjoys.

== Education ==
It is in the Hemet Unified School District.

- Hamilton High School

Colleges and universities:

- Olivet University, a private Christian university, is located in Anza.

== Notable people ==
- Red Skelton lived here until his death. He owned a 600-acre (240 ha) horse ranch in the Anza Valley.
