= Masonic Temple (Grand Canyon) =

Landform in the Grand Canyon, Arizona

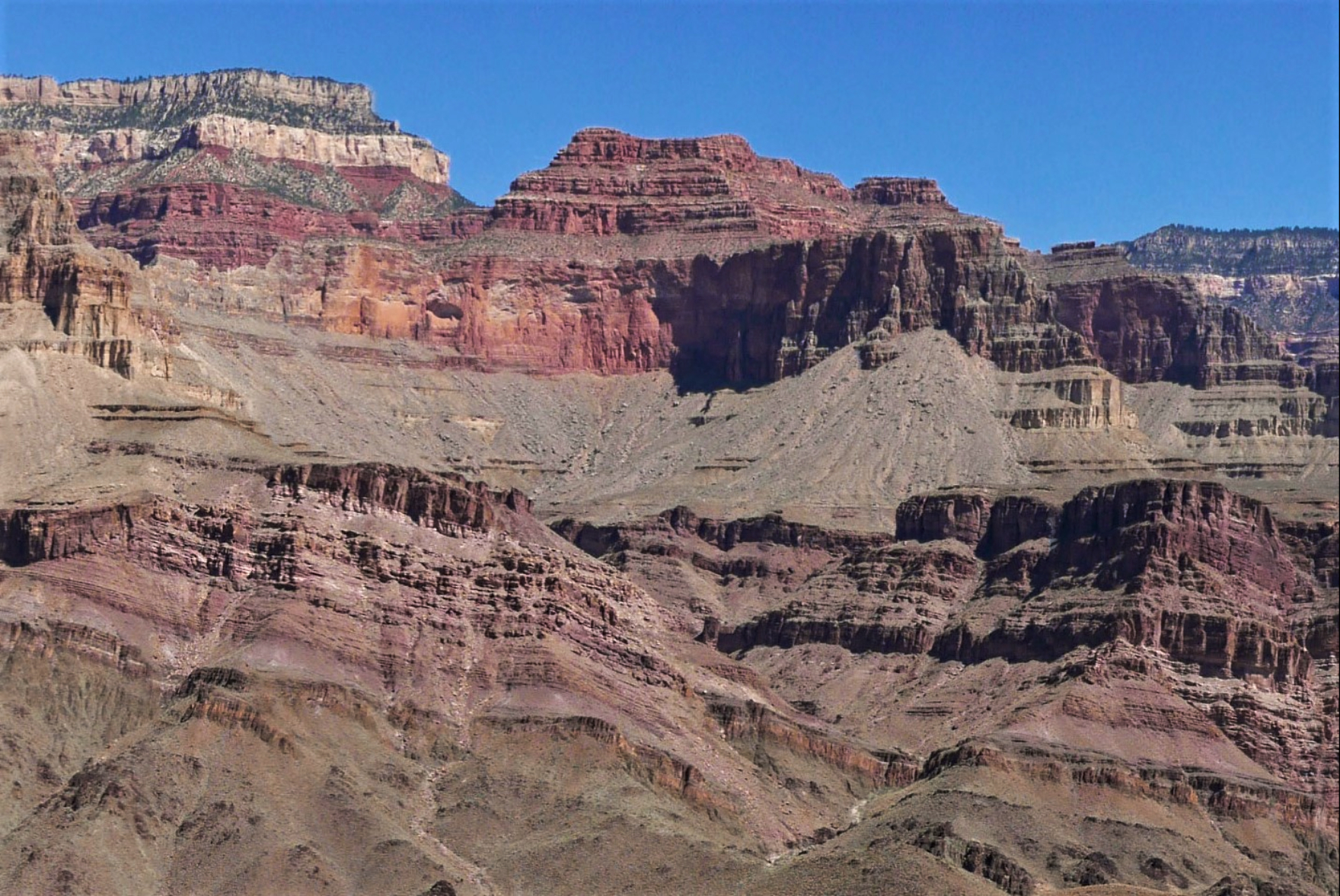
- South aspect (Dutton Point upper left)

Highest point
- Elevation: 6,242 ft (1,903 m)
- Prominence: 62 ft (19 m)
- Parent peak: Holy Grail Temple (6,711 ft)
- Isolation: 2.58 mi (4.15 km)
- Coordinates: 36°16′35″N 112°21′03″W

Geography
- Location within Arizona Location within the United States
- Country: United States
- State: Arizona
- County: Coconino
- Protected area: Grand Canyon National Park
- Parent range: Kaibab Plateau; Colorado Plateau
- Topo map: USGS King Arthur Castle

Geology
- Rock type(s): sandstone, limestone, shale

Climbing
- First ascent: Alan Doty
- Easiest route: class 4 climbing

Masonic Temple is a 6,242-foot-elevation (1,903-meter) summit located in the Grand Canyon, in Coconino County of northern Arizona, US. Set below Dutton Point on the Powell Plateau, and overlooking the Shinumo Amphitheater, it is situated three miles west of Holy Grail Temple, 2.7 miles northwest of Dox Castle, and 1.6 miles north-northeast of Fan Island. Topographic relief is significant as it rises 4,000 feet (1,200 meters) above the Colorado River in four miles (6.4 km). According to the Köppen climate classification system, Masonic Temple is located in a cold semi-arid climate zone, with precipitation runoff draining south to the Colorado River via Hakatai Canyon from the west aspect, Burro Canyon from the south aspect, and Muav Canyon from the east aspect. This butte is an erosional remnant composed of strata of the Pennsylvanian-Permian Supai Group overlaying the conspicuous cliffs of Mississippian Redwall Limestone, in turn overlaying the Cambrian Tonto Group.

== Etymology ==
Masonic Temple was named by George Wharton James as a tribute to the Order of Freemasons, an organization to which he belonged. To James, the immense angular walls below Dutton Point seemed to form a square, and the freemasonry expression "on the square" suggested to him the name. This feature's name was officially adopted in 1908 by the U.S. Board on Geographic Names.

== Gallery ==
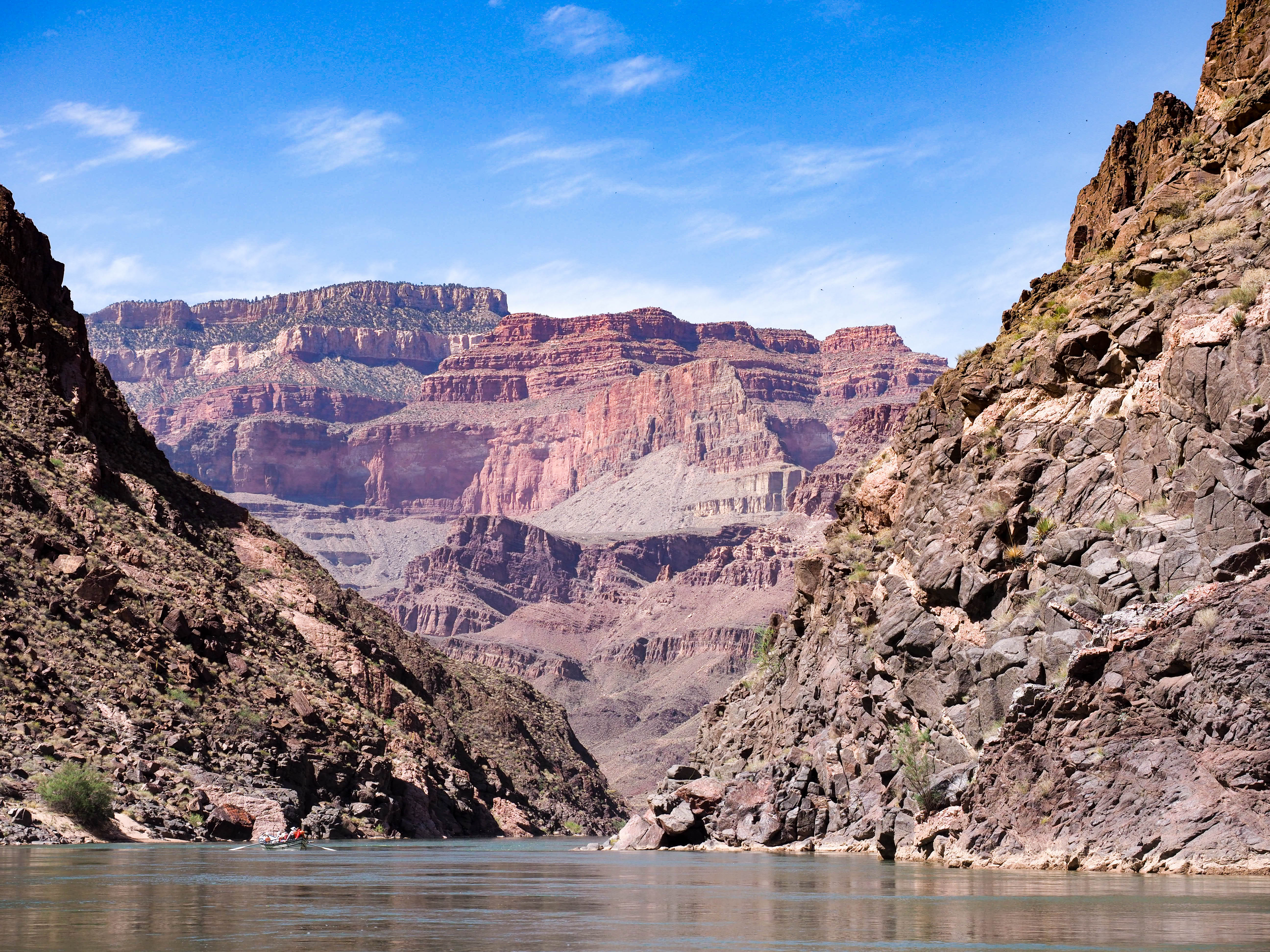
South aspect from Colorado River (Dutton Point behind to left)

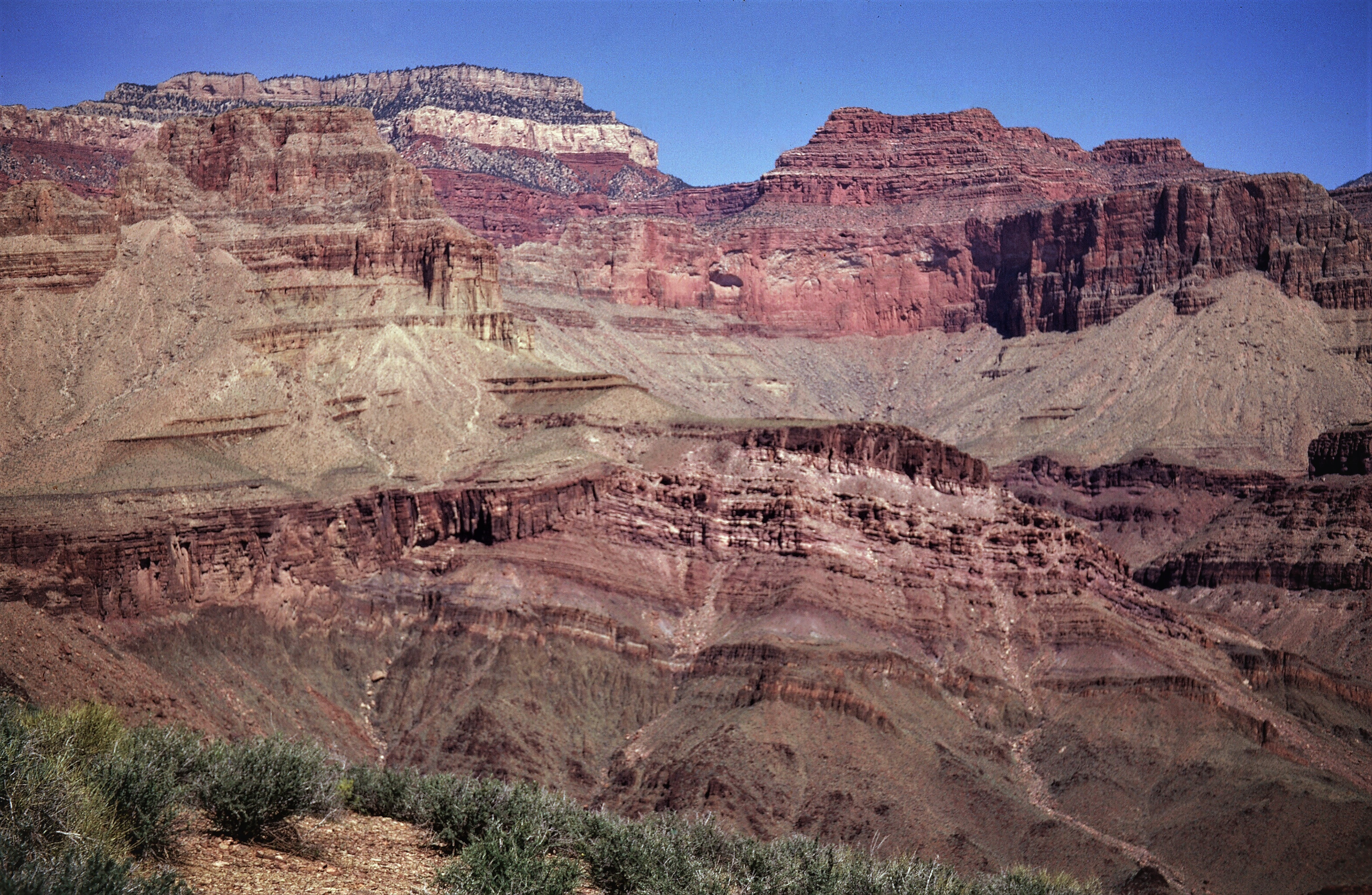
Fan Island (left), with Dutton Point looming behind it. Masonic Temple to right.

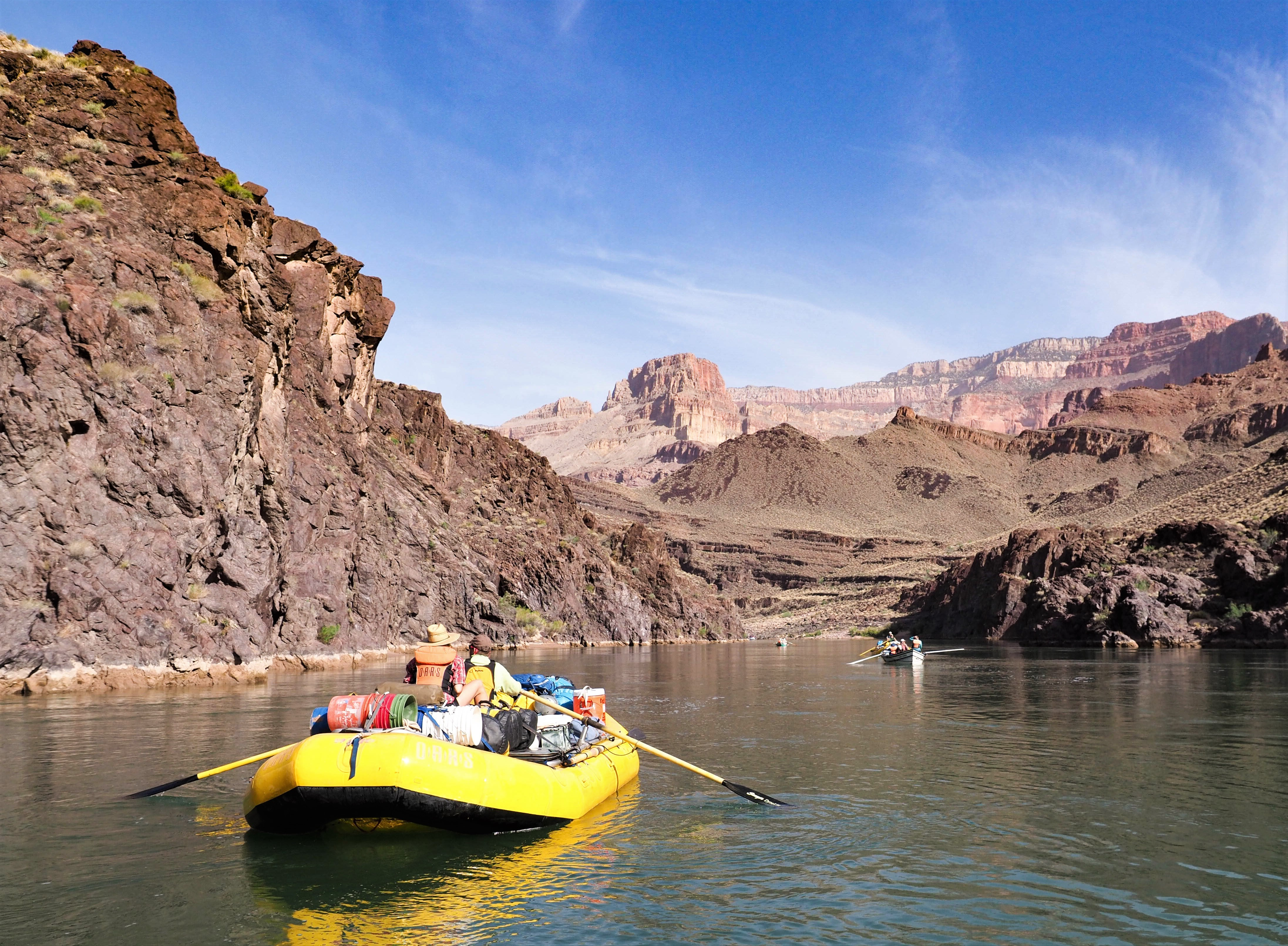
Masonic Temple in upper right

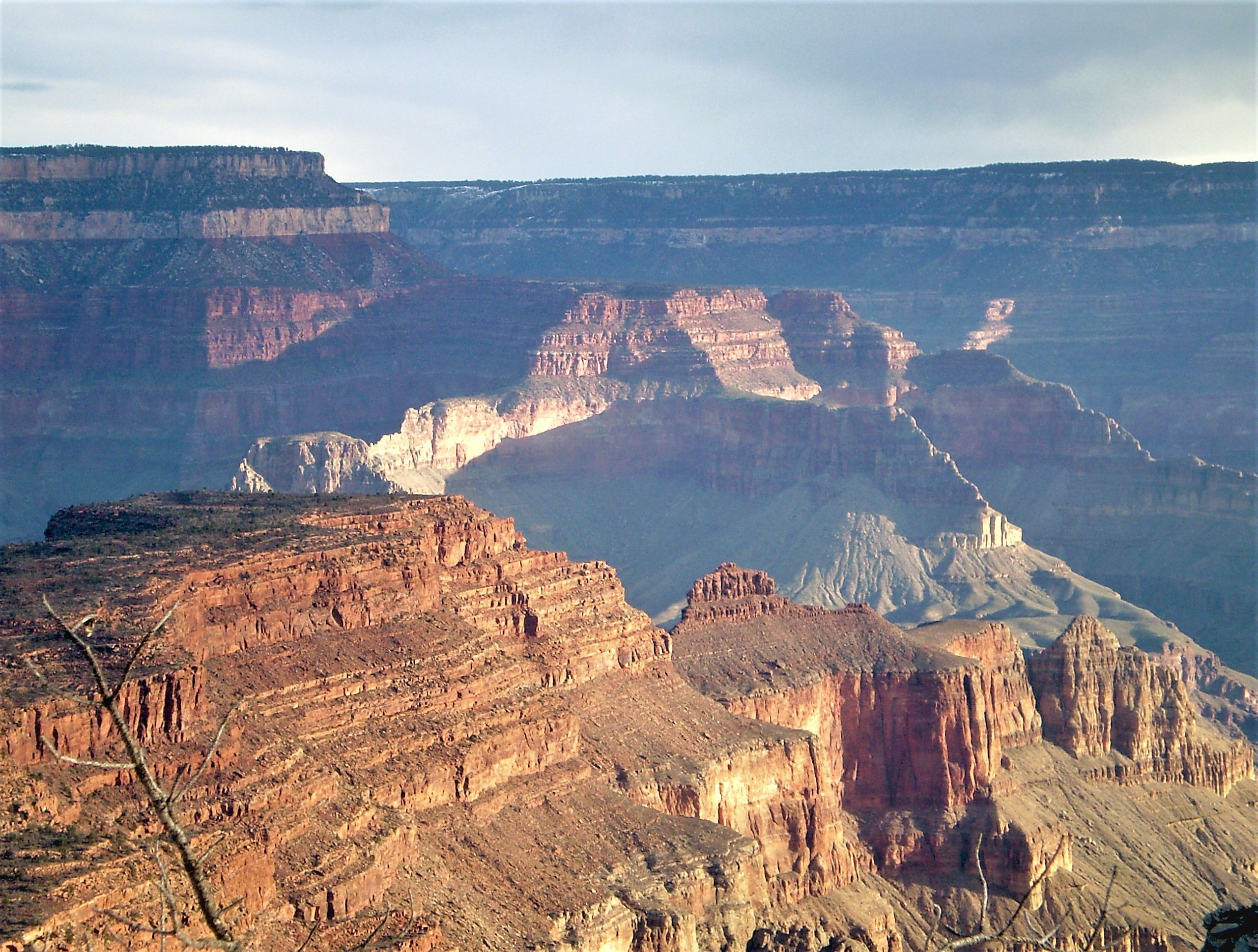
Dutton Point and Masonic Temple in the distance.
Huxley Terrace, Wallace Butte, and Tyndall Dome in front.

== See also ==
- Geology of the Grand Canyon area
