= Holy Grail Temple =

Landform in the Grand Canyon, Arizona

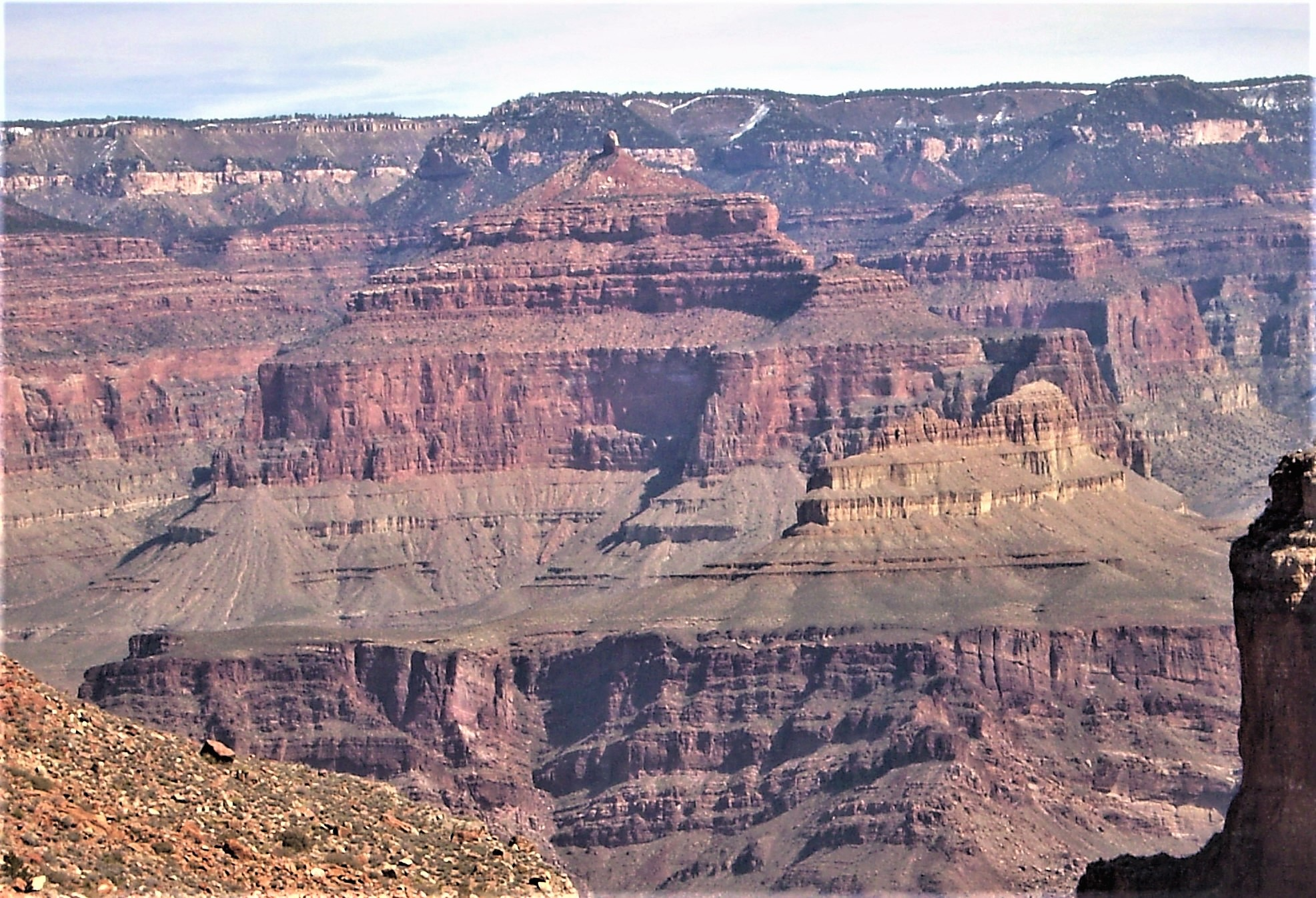
- Southwest aspect, with Dox Castle, seen from South Bass Trail

Highest point
- Elevation: 6,711 ft (2,046 m)
- Prominence: 1,199 ft (365 m)
- Parent peak: King Arthur Castle (7,344 ft)
- Isolation: 2.0 mi (3.2 km)
- Coordinates: 36°16′30″N 112°18′17″W

Geography
- Location within Arizona Location within the United States
- Country: United States
- State: Arizona
- County: Coconino
- Protected area: Grand Canyon National Park
- Parent range: Kaibab Plateau; Colorado Plateau
- Topo map: USGS King Arthur Castle

Geology
- Rock type(s): sandstone, siltstone, mudstone

Climbing
- First ascent: 1977
- Easiest route: class 5.8 climbing

Holy Grail Temple is a 6,711-foot-elevation (2,046-meter) summit located in the Grand Canyon, in Coconino County of northern Arizona, US. It is situated seven miles north-northeast of Havasupai Point, and two miles west-northwest of King Arthur Castle, within the Shinumo Amphitheater. Topographic relief is significant as it rises over 4,500 feet (1,400 meters) above the Colorado River in three miles. According to the Köppen climate classification system, Holy Grail Temple is located in a cold semi-arid climate zone, with precipitation runoff draining south to Shinumo Creek, which flows west to the Colorado River.

== History ==
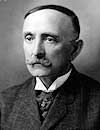
W. W. Bass

Holy Grail Temple was originally named "Bass Tomb" in 1891 by Virginia Dox, for William Wallace Bass, who was Dox's guide into the Grand Canyon at this location. Impressed by her, Bass named nearby Dox Castle shortly after she left. However, at the suggestion of the U.S. Geological Survey, Bass Tomb was renamed "Holy Grail Temple", for the Holy Grail of the Legend of King Arthur, in keeping with the naming theme for other geographical features in the vicinity, e.g. King Arthur Castle, Guinevere Castle, Elaine Castle, Excalibur, Gawain Abyss, Bedivere Point, Lancelot Point, and Galahad Point. This feature's present name was officially adopted in 1908 by the U.S. Board on Geographic Names.

When William W. Bass died in 1933, his ashes were scattered by plane atop this mountain as per his wishes. Bass Canyon and the Bass Trails still retain his name within the Grand Canyon.

The difficult first ascent of the summit was made in 1977 by Larry Treiber and Bruce Grubbs.

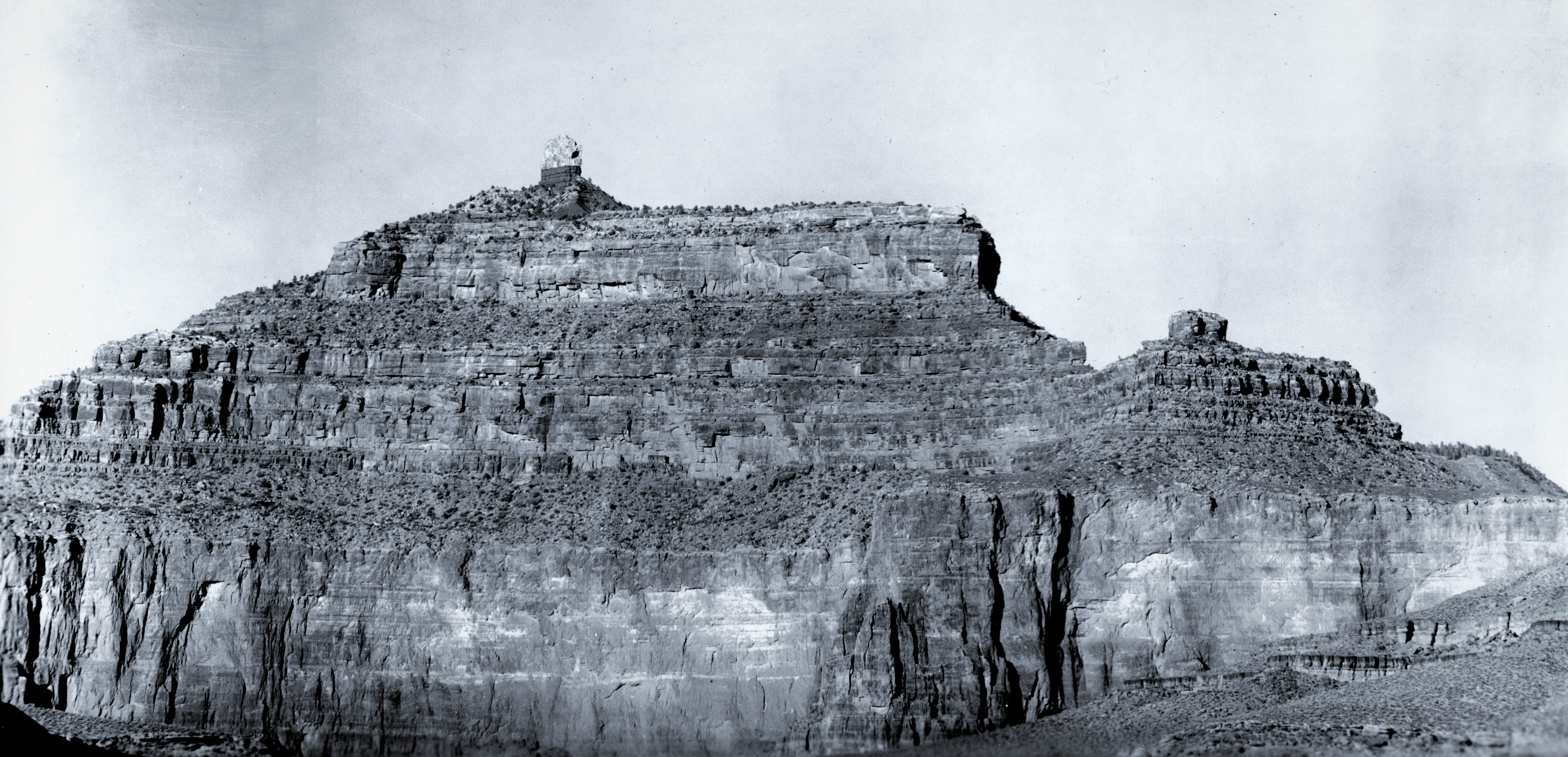
Holy Grail Temple in 1901 (Bass Tomb at that time)

== Geology ==
The summit spire is composed of cream-colored Permian Coconino Sandstone. This sandstone, which is the third-youngest stratum in the Grand Canyon, was deposited 265 million years ago as sand dunes. Below the Coconino Sandstone is slope-forming, Permian Hermit Formation, which in turn overlays the Pennsylvanian-Permian Supai Group. Further down are strata of the cliff-forming Mississippian Redwall Limestone, Cambrian Tonto Group, and finally Proterozoic Unkar Group at creek level.

The actual small-spire summit is a capstone of Coconino Sandstone, on a small slope of Hermit Formation. This summit sits upon an extensive shelf of the Supai Group, specifically the highly resistant, and thick in western Grand Canyon, Esplanade Sandstone.

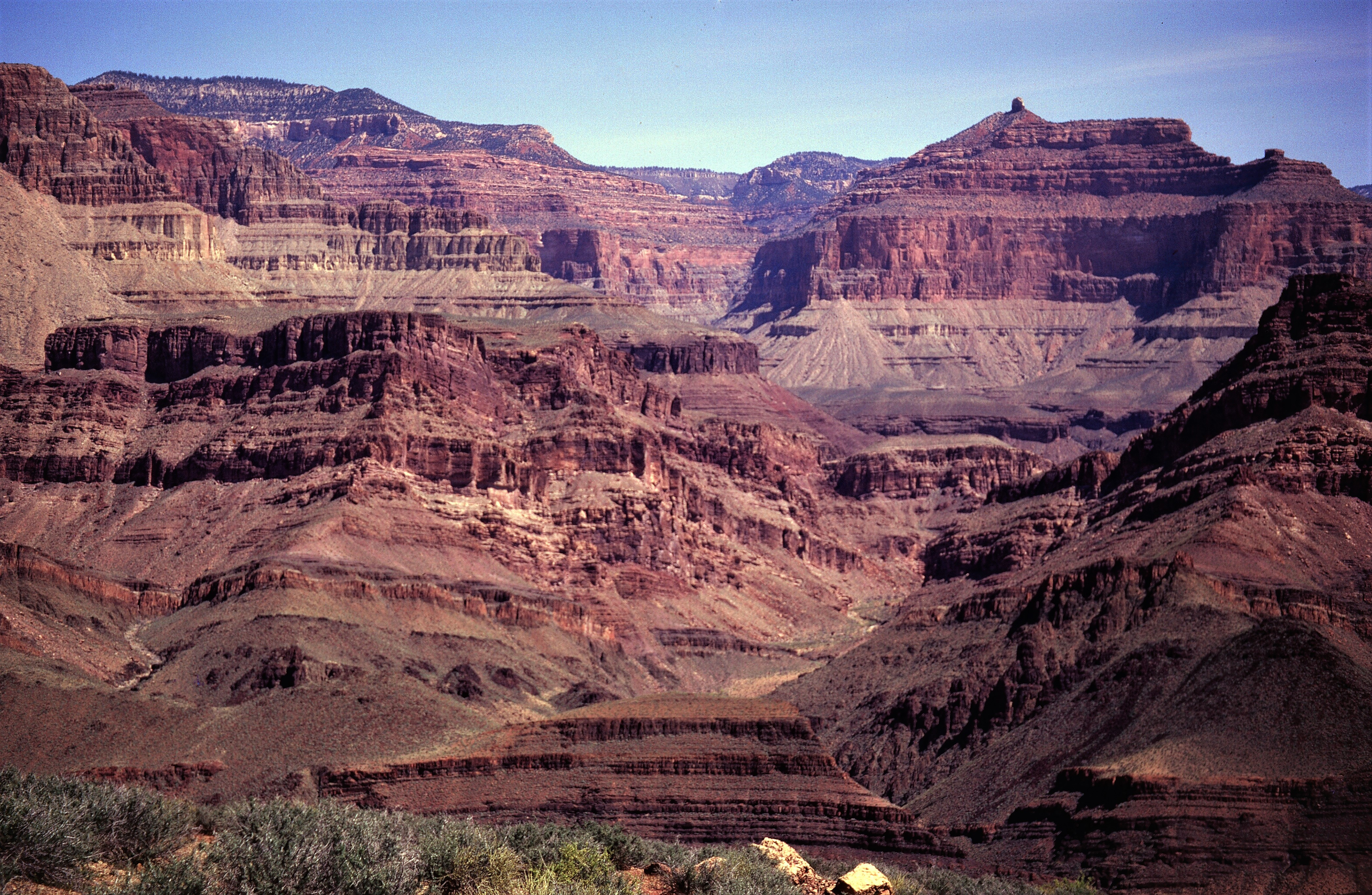
View northeast toward Shinumo Creek canyon and toward tilted strata of Neoproterozoic Bass Formation “island” of northeast-dipping Mesoproterozoic strata. Holy Grail Temple in upper right.

== See also ==
- Geology of the Grand Canyon area
- History of the Grand Canyon area
