= Evans Butte (Grand Canyon) =

Landform in the Grand Canyon, Arizona

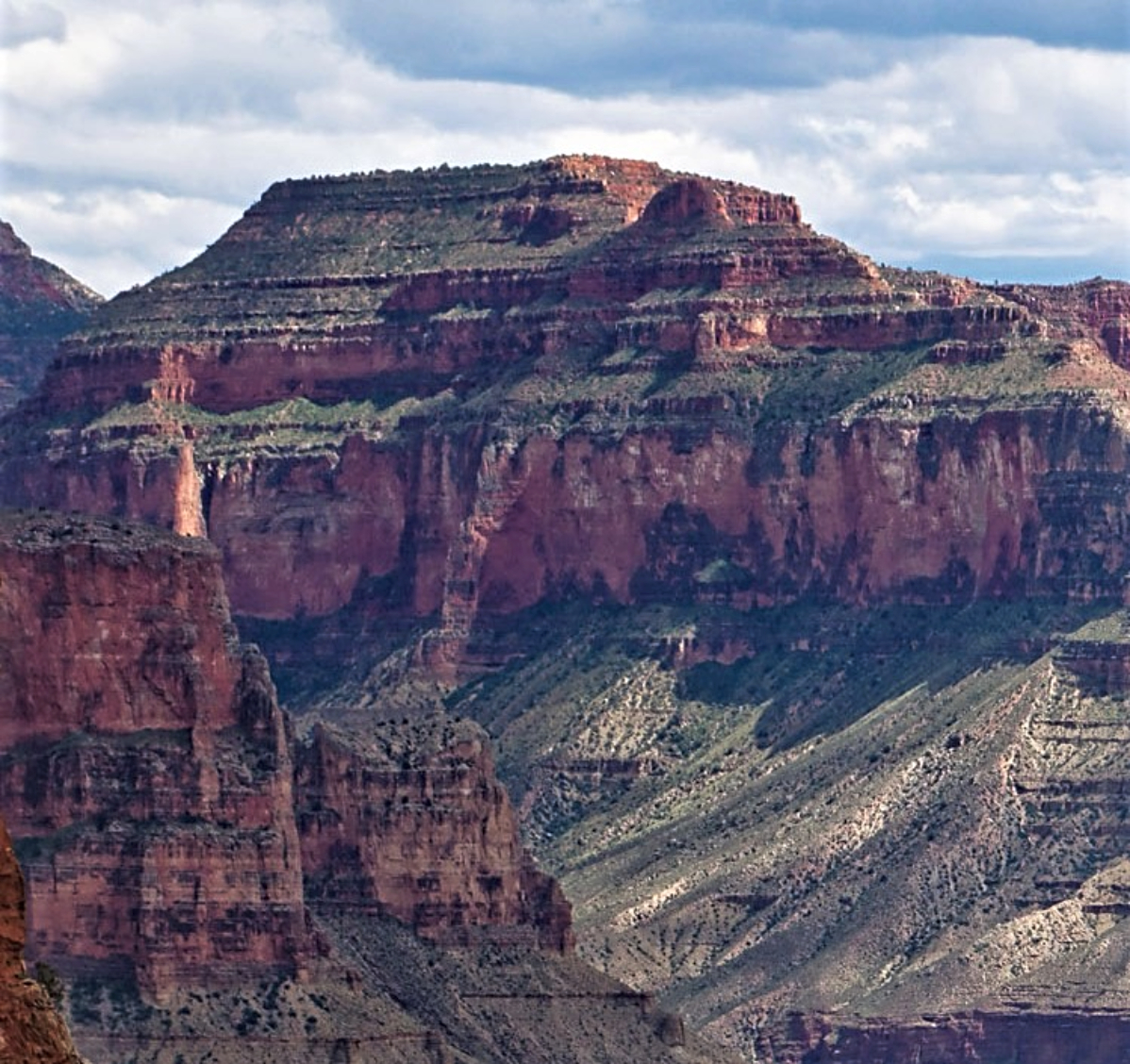
- Northwest aspect

Highest point
- Elevation: 6,379 ft (1,944 m)
- Prominence: 599 ft (183 m)
- Parent peak: Guinevere Castle (7,281 ft)
- Isolation: 2.54 mi (4.09 km)
- Coordinates: 36°13′47″N 112°17′29″W

Geography
- Location within Arizona Location within the United States
- Country: United States
- State: Arizona
- County: Coconino
- Protected area: Grand Canyon National Park
- Parent range: Kaibab Plateau; Colorado Plateau
- Topo map: USGS Havasupai Point

Geology
- Rock type(s): sandstone. limestone, shale

Climbing
- First ascent: 1963
- Easiest route: scrambling

Evans Butte is a 6,379-foot-elevation (1,944-meter) summit located in the Grand Canyon, in Coconino County of northern Arizona, US. It is situated at the north end of Sagittarius Ridge, three miles south-southwest of King Arthur Castle, and two miles southeast of Dox Castle. Topographic relief is significant as it rises over 4,100 feet (1,200 meters) above the Colorado River in 2.5 miles (4.0 km), and the north aspect rises 2,700 feet above Flint Creek in one mile. According to the Köppen climate classification system, Evans Butte is located in a cold semi-arid climate zone, with precipitation runoff draining west to the Colorado River via Shinumo Creek, Hotauta Canyon, and Monadnock Amphitheater. The butte is composed of Pennsylvanian-Permian Supai Group overlaying the cliff-forming Mississippian Redwall Limestone, and Cambrian Tonto Group. Evans Butte was climbed solo by Harvey Butchart on October 11, 1976, thereby making it the 76th of the 83 summits which he climbed in the Grand Canyon.

== Richard Tranter Evans ==
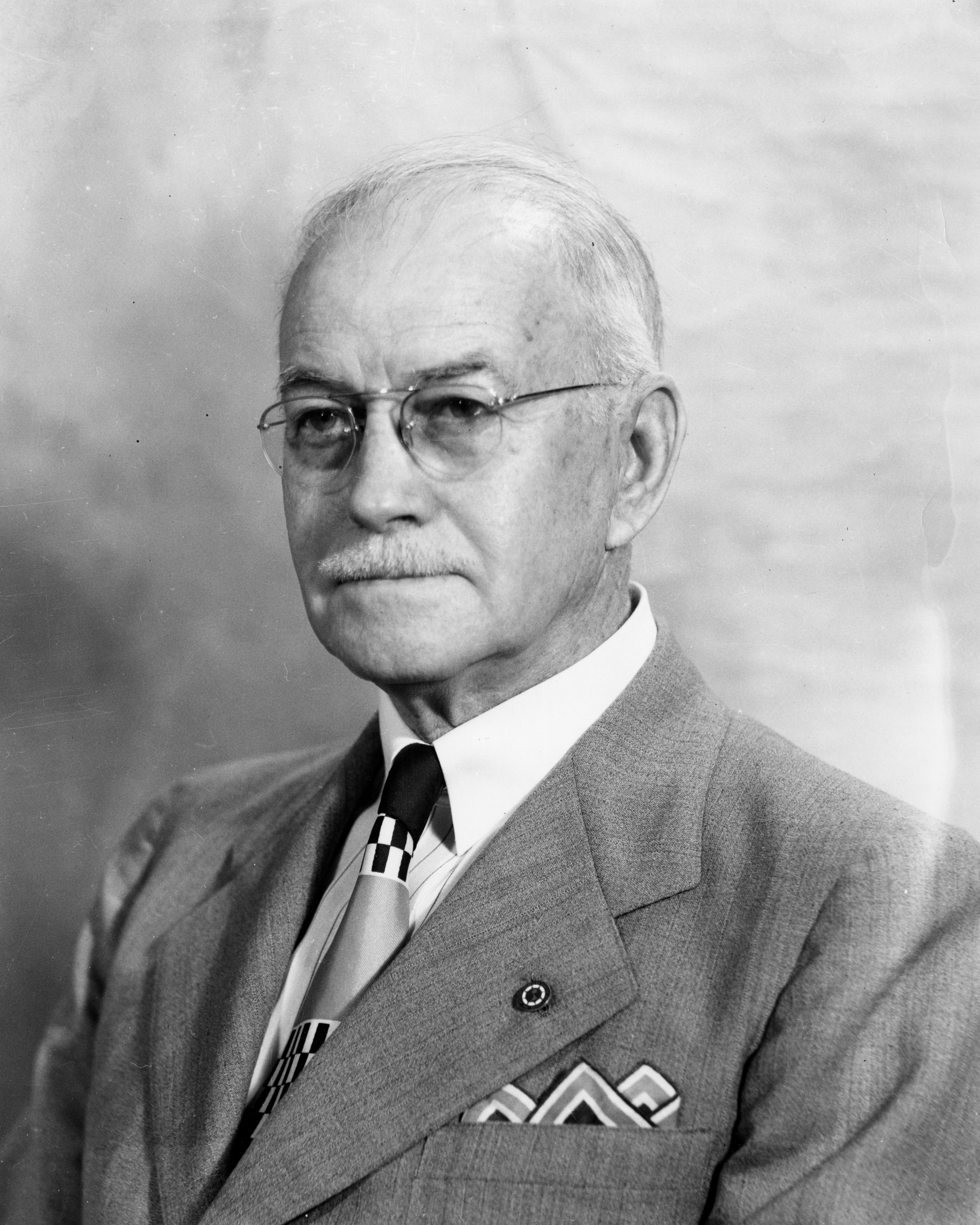
R.T. Evans, 1957

Evans Butte was named after Richard Tranter Evans (1881–1966), U.S. Geological Survey senior topographic engineer from 1899 to 1951, who surveyed and mapped this area of the Grand Canyon in 1904. In the course of his mapping, this cartographer bestowed several nearby geographical features with an Arthurian legend naming theme, e.g. King Arthur Castle, Guinevere Castle, Elaine Castle, Merlin Abyss, Gawain Abyss, Bedivere Point, Lancelot Point, and Galahad Point. Richard T. Evans was a protégé of François E. Matthes. Evans completed 107 topographic mapping assignments, which included several national park areas. He drew the first topographic maps of Pikes Peak, the Grand Canyon, and Salt Lake City. He was the acting superintendent of Zion National Park from 1925 to 1926, and superintendent of Hawaii National Park from 1927 to 1928. He was a member of the Cosmos Club, The Explorers Club, American Society of Civil Engineers, and a Member Emeritus of American Society for Photogrammetry. This geographical feature's toponym was officially adopted in 1969 by the U.S. Board on Geographic Names.

== See also ==
- Geology of the Grand Canyon area

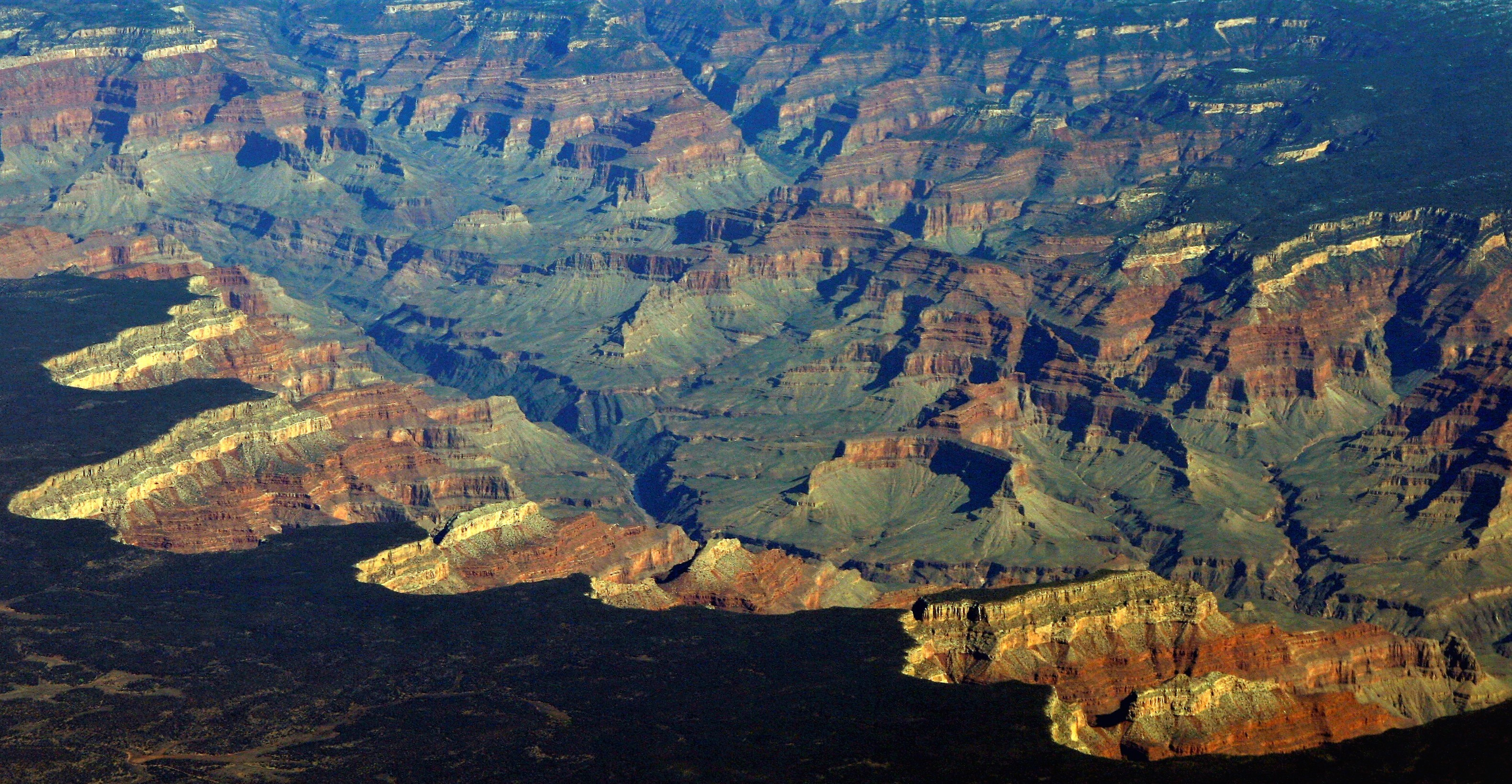
Grand Canyon from airliner. Evans Butte slightly above center
