= Excalibur (Arizona) =

Geologic formation on the Grand Canyon, Arizona

- Location within Arizona

Highest point
- Elevation: 7,052 ft (2,149 m) NGVD 29
- Coordinates: 36°15′45″N 112°15′18″W

Geography
- Location: Coconino County, Arizona, U.S.
- Topo map: USGS King Arthur Castle

Excalibur is a formation on the north rim of the Grand Canyon in Coconino County, Arizona. It was named by cartographer and geologist François E. Matthes in 1908 for Excalibur, the legendary sword of King Arthur which was given to him by the Lady of the Lake. Other features in the area include the Holy Grail Temple, King Arthur Castle, Guinevere Castle, Elaine Castle, and Galahad Point whose names refer to the Arthurian legend. The name probably refers to a spire near the summit of the promontory which might resemble the handle of Excalibur.
