= Appistoki Peak =

Mountain in Montana, United States

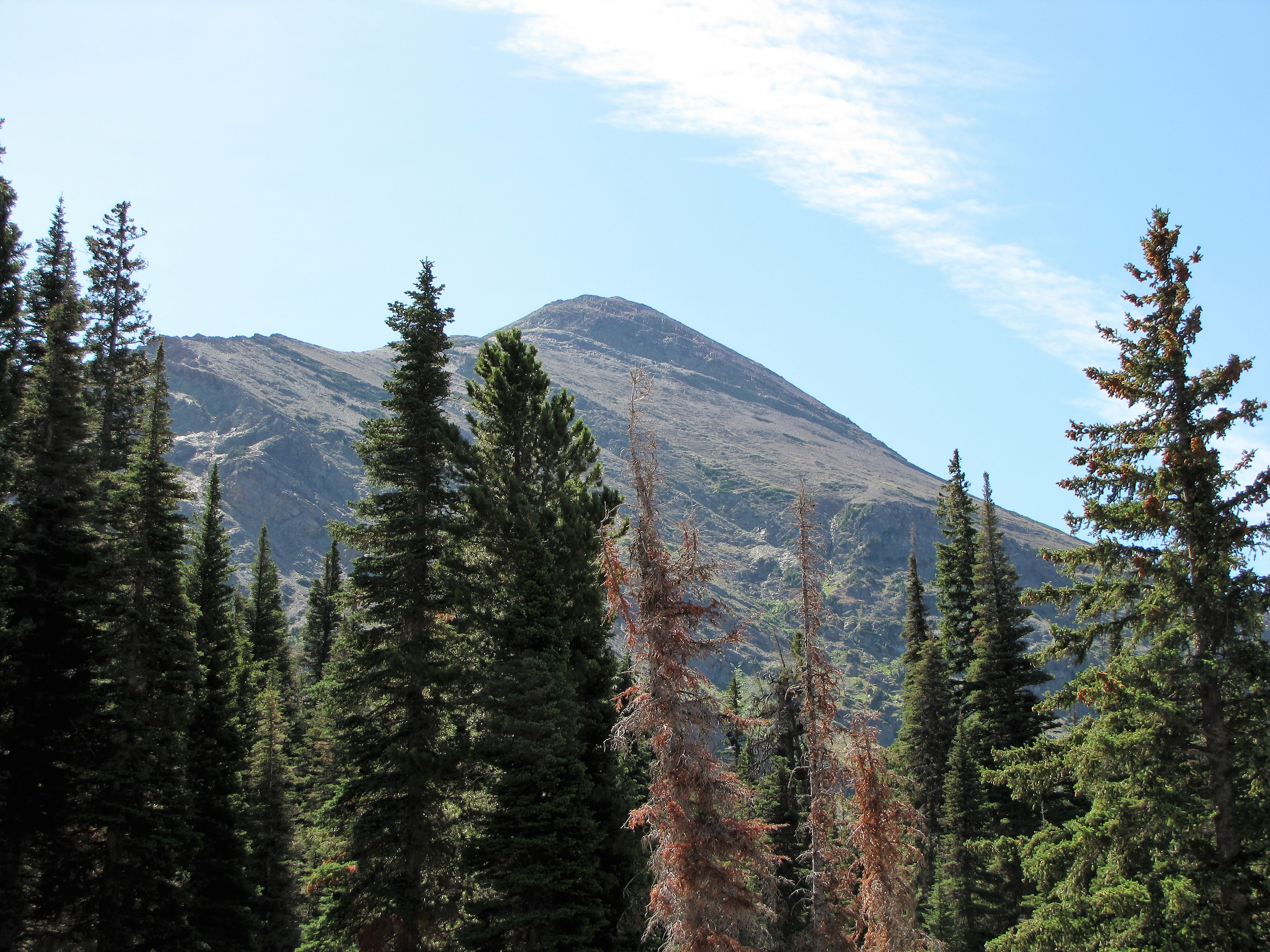
- Appistoki Peak from Two Medicine

Highest point
- Elevation: 8,169 ft (2,490 m)
- Prominence: 497 ft (151 m)
- Coordinates: 48°28′4″N 113°21′15″W

Geography
- Location within Montana Location within the United States
- Location: Glacier County, Montana, U.S.
- Parent range: Lewis Range
- Topo map: USGS Squaw Mountain MT

Climbing
- Easiest route: Hike

Appistoki Peak (8,169 feet (2,490 m)) is located in the Lewis Range, Glacier National Park in the U.S. state of Montana. Appistoki Peak, "was named by R. T. Evans, a topographer who worked on the early map of the park. It is reported that he inquired from his Indian guide what word the Blackfeet used for "looking over something," and the guide, misunderstanding the meaning of his question, gave him the name "Appistoki," for the Indian god who looks over everything and everyone." Appistoki Peak rises on the southeast shore of Two Medicine Lake and is a short distance north of Mount Henry.

== See also ==
- Mountains and mountain ranges of Glacier National Park (U.S.)
