= Fan Island =

Mountain in the Grand Canyon, Arizona

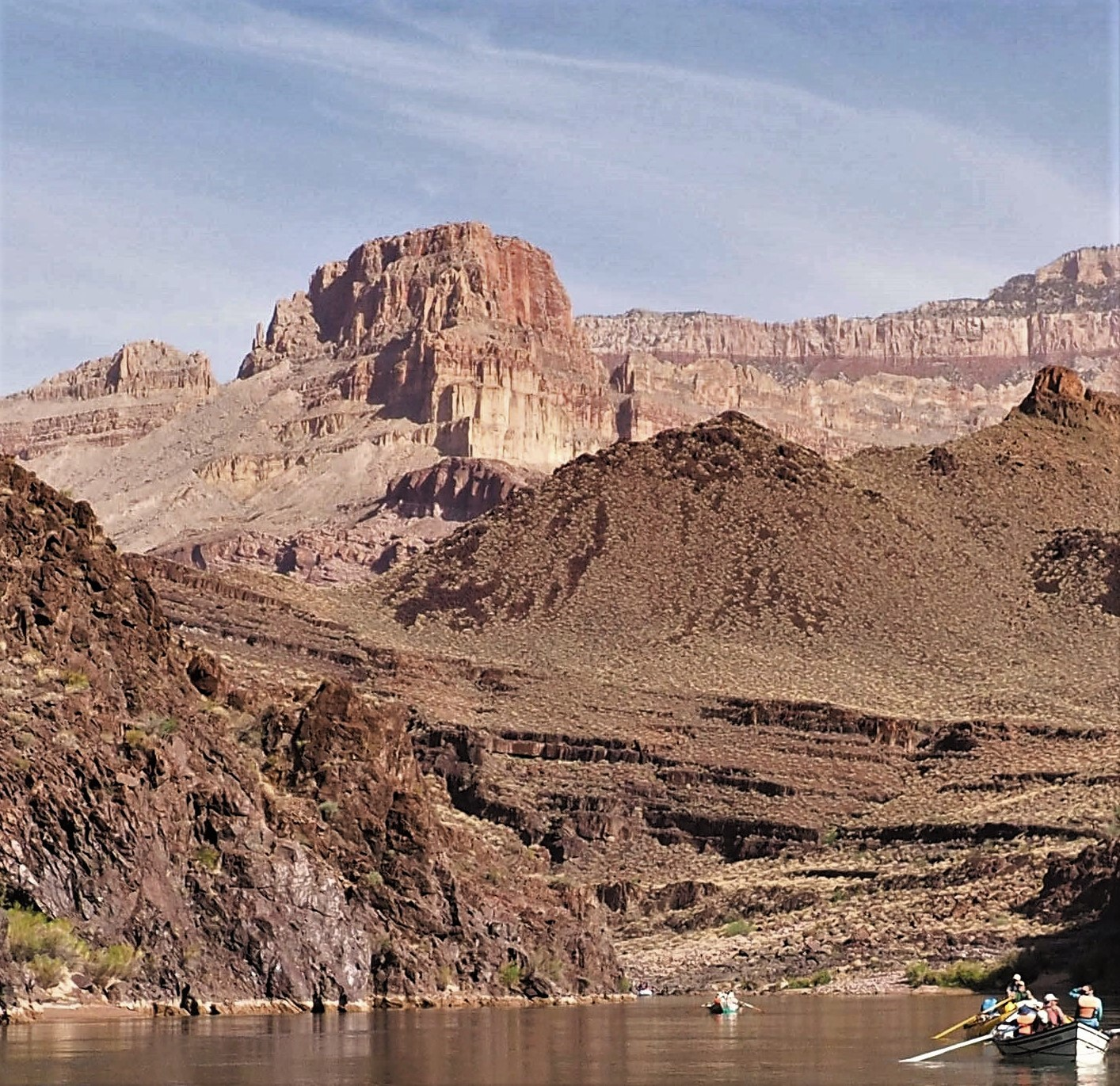
- Southeast aspect, from Colorado River

Highest point
- Elevation: 5,092 ft (1,552 m)
- Prominence: 452 ft (138 m)
- Parent peak: Powell Plateau (7,661 ft)
- Isolation: 2.33 mi (3.75 km)
- Coordinates: 36°15′27″N 112°21′52″W

Geography
- Location within Arizona Location within the United States
- Country: United States
- State: Arizona
- County: Coconino
- Protected area: Grand Canyon National Park
- Parent range: Kaibab Plateau; Colorado Plateau
- Topo map: USGS King Arthur Castle

Geology
- Rock type(s): Redwall Limestone; Tonto Group

Climbing
- First ascent: Jim Ohlman, Jim Kirschvink
- Easiest route: class 5.4 climbing

Fan Island is a 5,092-foot-elevation (1,552-meter) summit located in the Grand Canyon, in Coconino County of northern Arizona, US. It is situated two miles south of Dutton Point, 2.5 miles west-northwest of Dox Castle, and 1.6 miles south-southwest of Masonic Temple. Topographic relief is significant as it rises 2,900 feet (880 meters) above the Colorado River in one mile (1.6 km). Fan Island was so named because the flat top resembles an unfolded hand fan. According to the Köppen climate classification system, Fan Island is located in a cold semi-arid climate zone, with precipitation runoff draining south to the Colorado River via Hakatai Canyon from the west aspect, and Burro Canyon from the east aspect. This butte is an erosional remnant composed of Redwall Limestone overlaying the Tonto Group.

== See also ==
- Geology of the Grand Canyon area

== Gallery ==
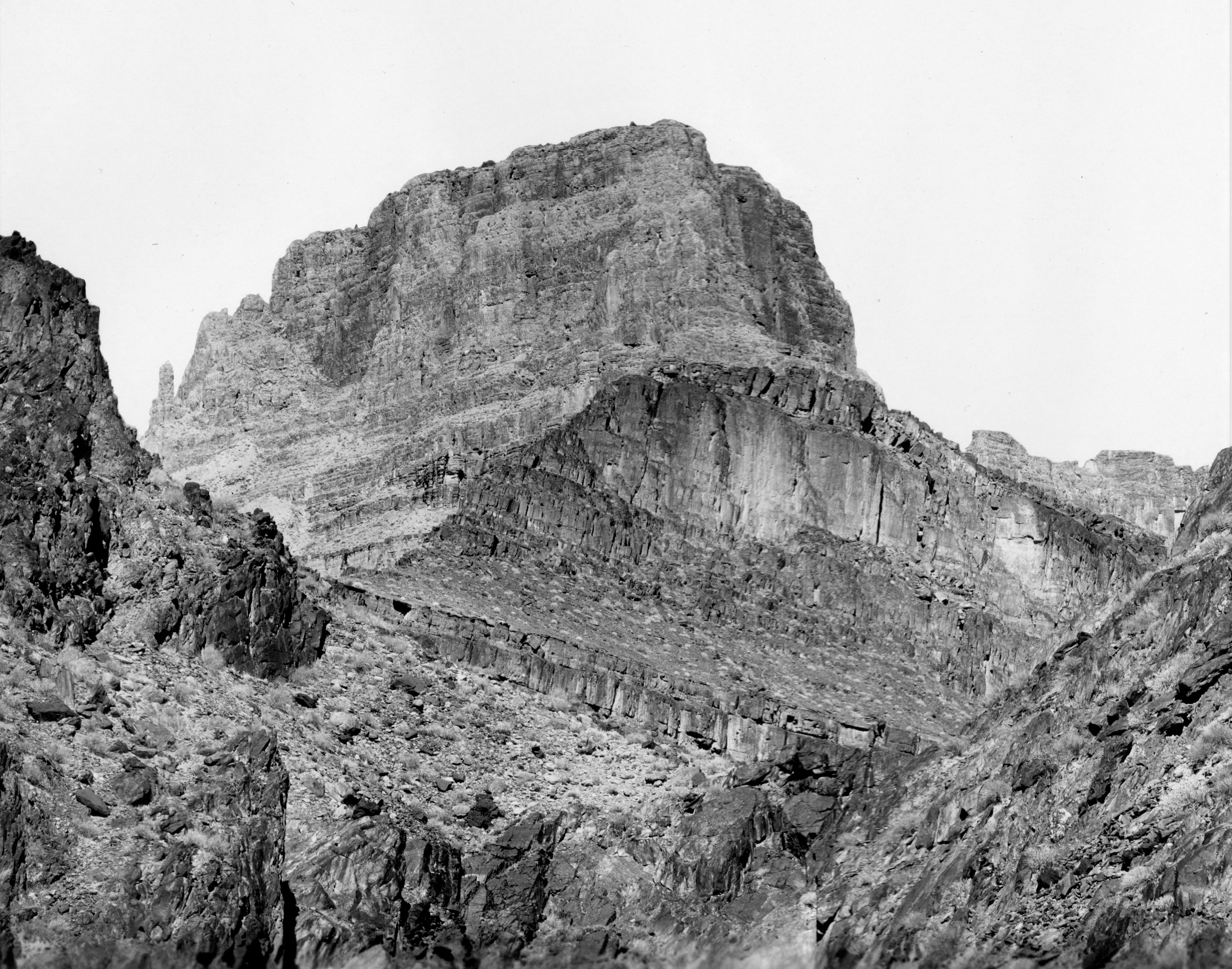
Southeast aspect, 1901

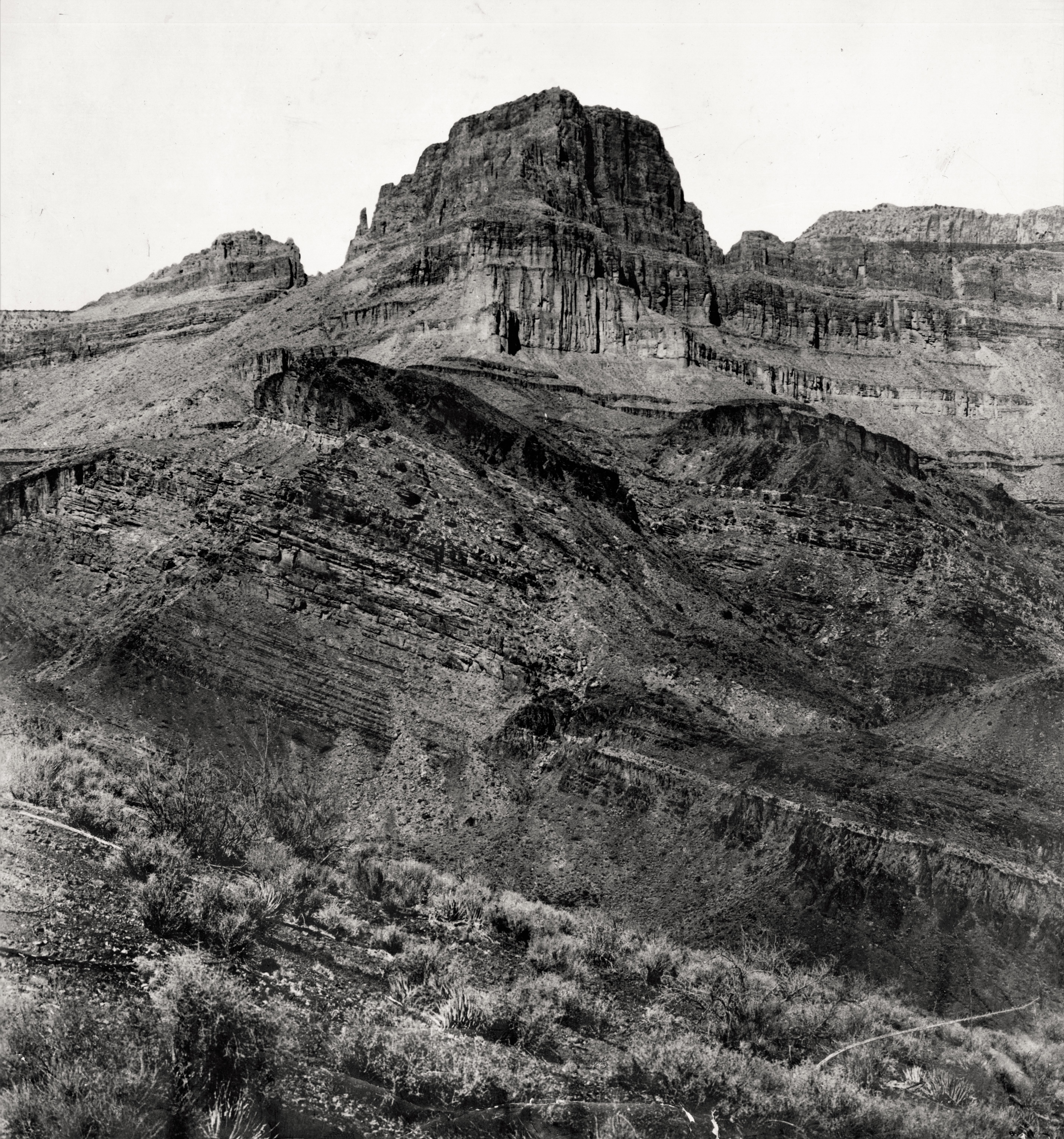
Fan Island in 1901

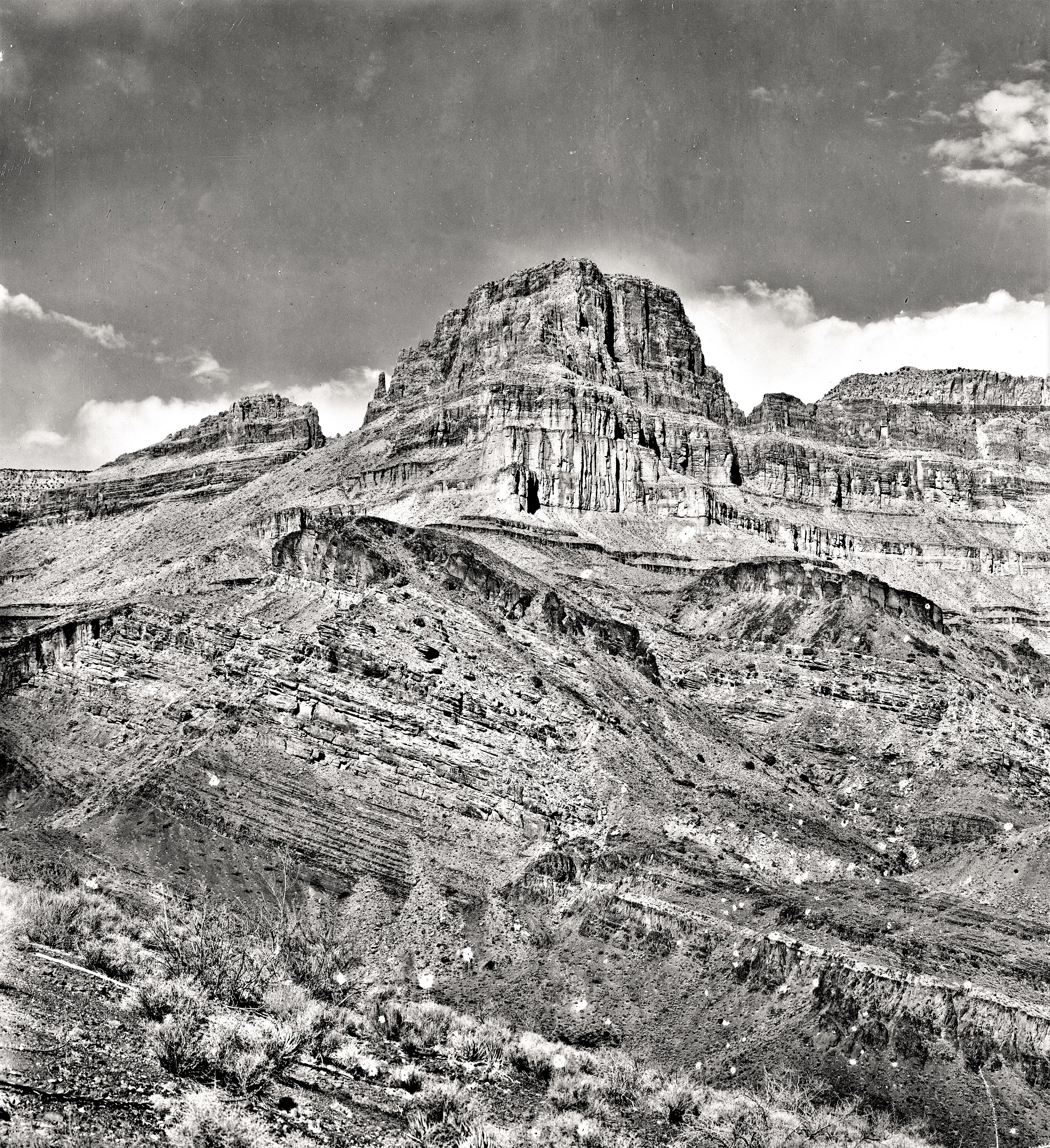
Fan Island, Burro Canyon

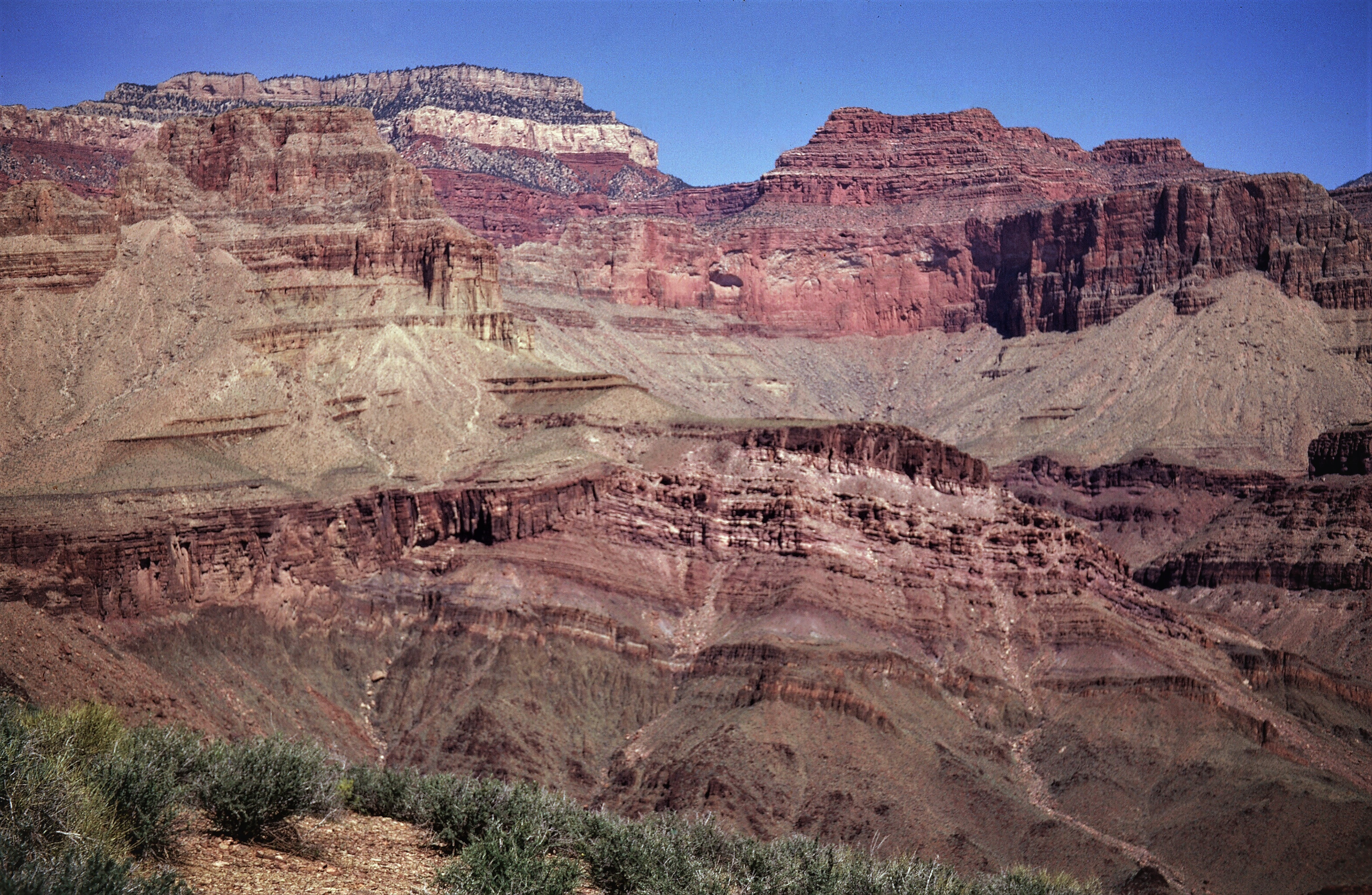
Fan Island (left), with Dutton Point looming behind it. Masonic Temple to right.

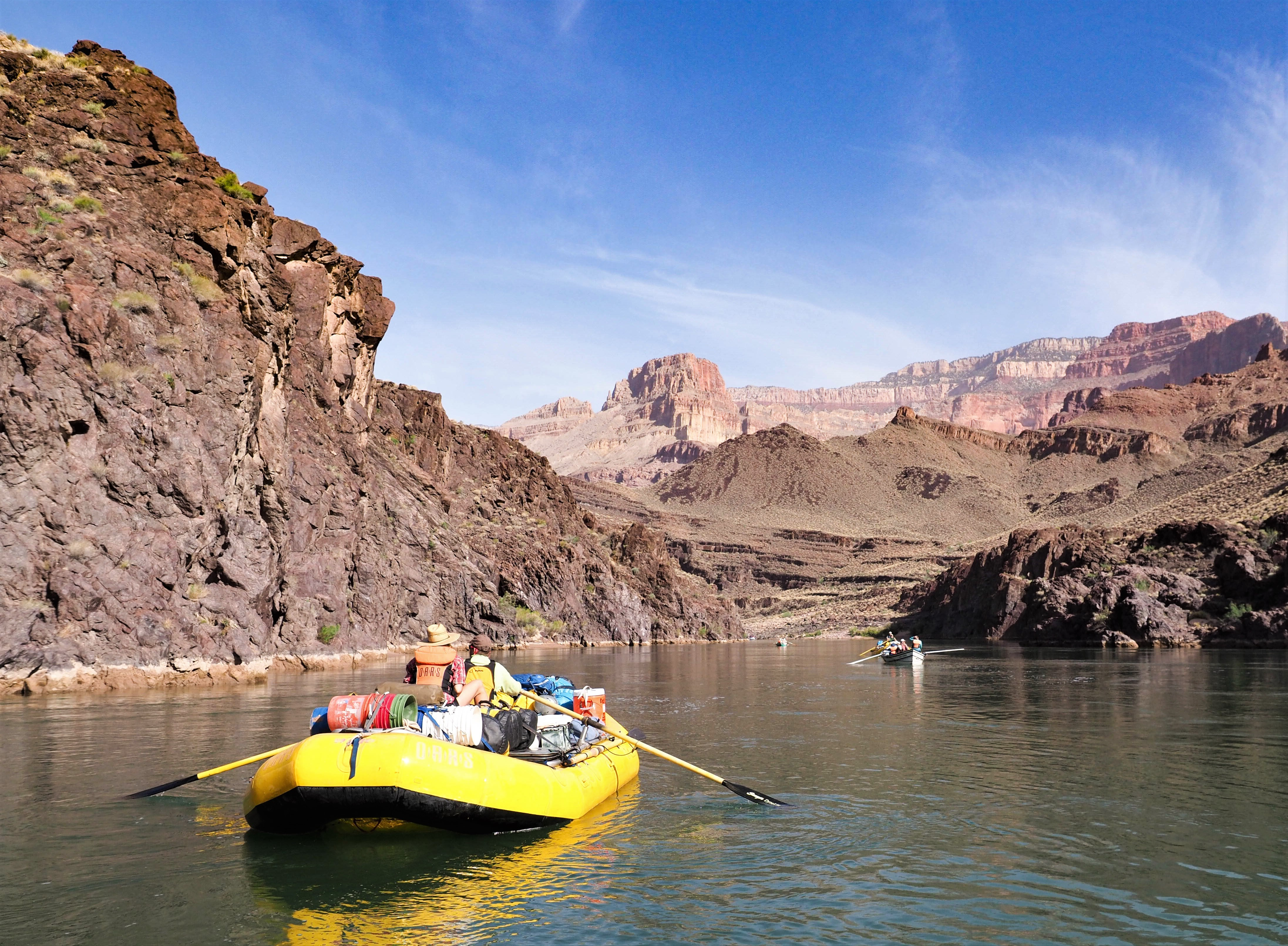
Fan Island centered in the distance

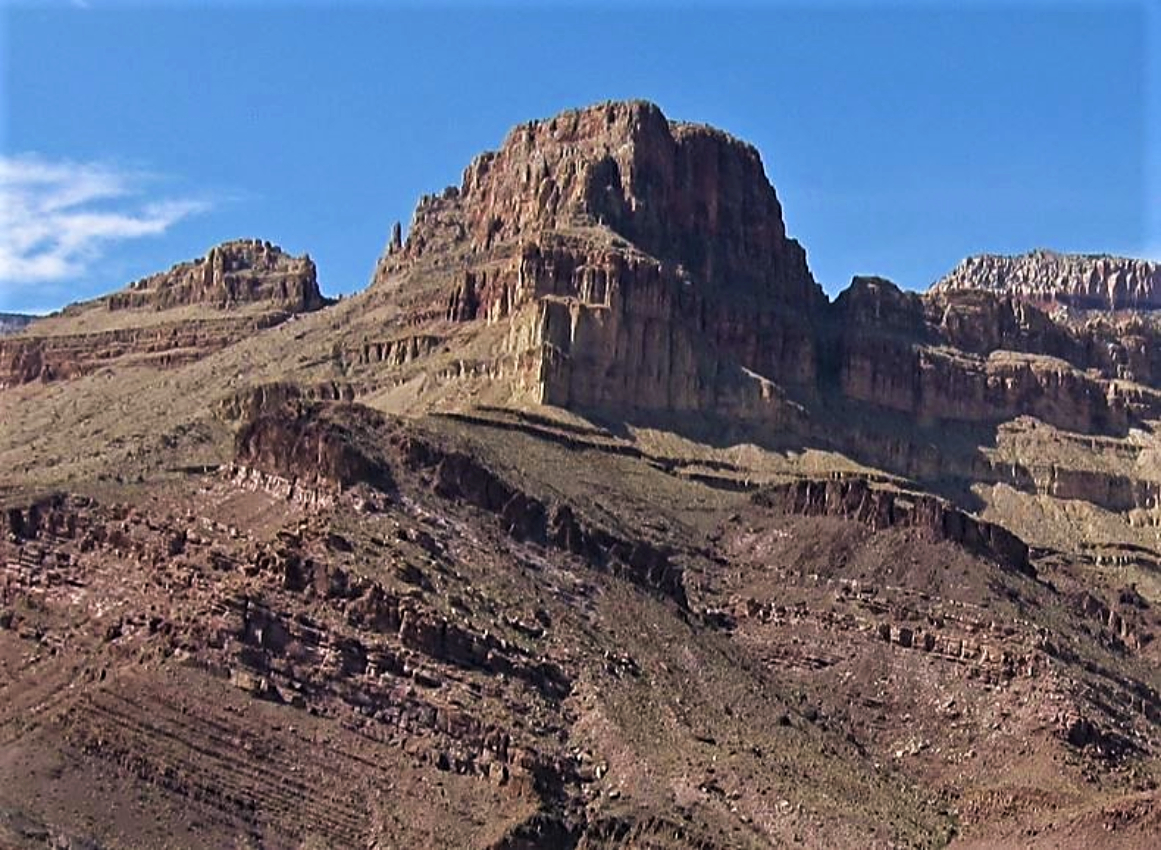

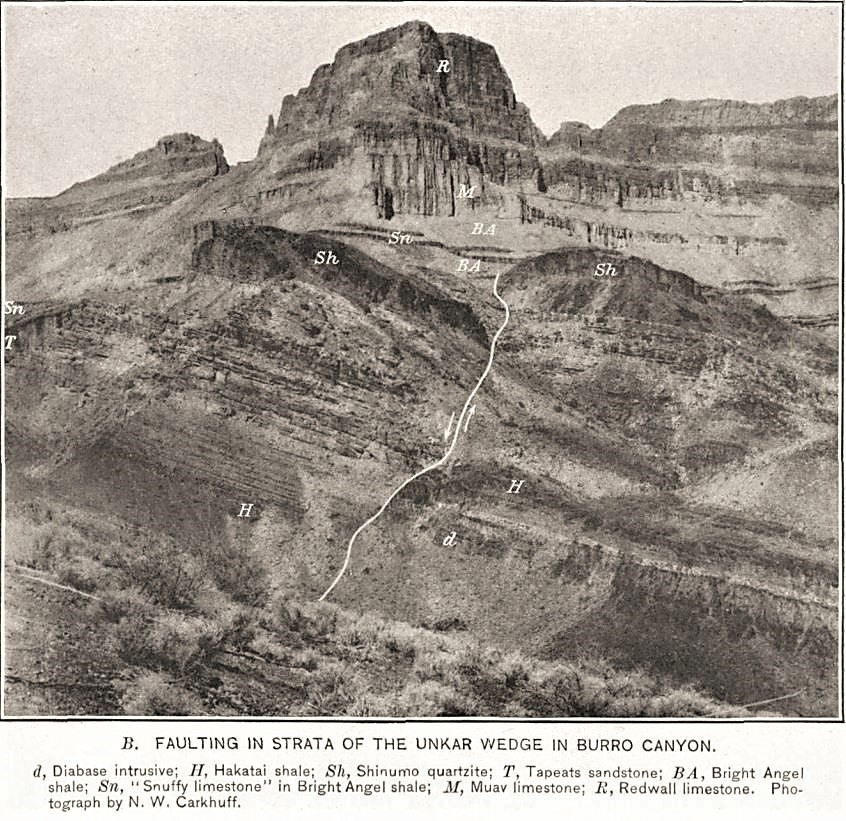
