= King Arthur Castle =

Landform in the Grand Canyon, Arizona

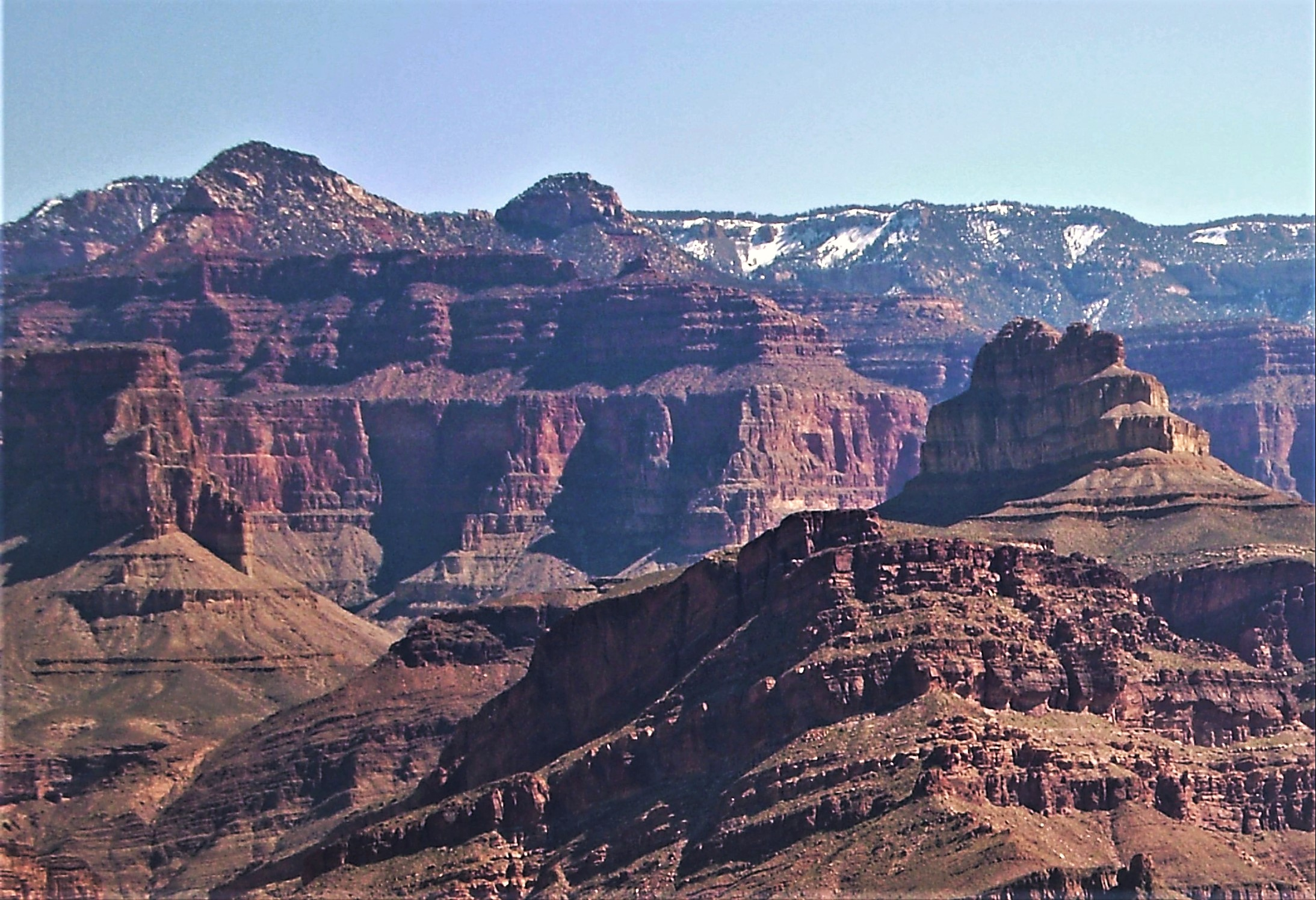
- King Arthur Castle upper left with Guinevere Castle. Dox Castle to right. From the west.

Highest point
- Elevation: 7,344 ft (2,238 m)
- Prominence: 804 ft (245 m)
- Parent peak: Elaine Castle (7,431 ft)
- Isolation: 2.88 mi (4.63 km)
- Coordinates: 36°15′52″N 112°16′17″W

Geography
- Location within Arizona Location within the United States
- Country: United States
- State: Arizona
- County: Coconino
- Protected area: Grand Canyon National Park
- Parent range: Kaibab Plateau; Colorado Plateau
- Topo map: USGS King Arthur Castle

Geology
- Rock type(s): limestone, sandstone, mudstone

Climbing
- First ascent: 1961, Merrel Clubb

King Arthur Castle is a 7,344-foot-elevation (2,238-meter) summit located in the Grand Canyon, in Coconino County of northern Arizona, US. It is situated one-half mile northwest of Guinevere Castle, one mile west of Excalibur, and two miles east-southeast of Holy Grail Temple, within the Shinumo Amphitheater. Topographic relief is significant as it rises over 5,100 feet (1,600 meters) above the Colorado River in 4.5 miles (7.2 km). According to the Köppen climate classification system, King Arthur Castle is located in a cold semi-arid climate zone, with precipitation runoff draining west to the Colorado River via Shinumo Creek.

== History ==
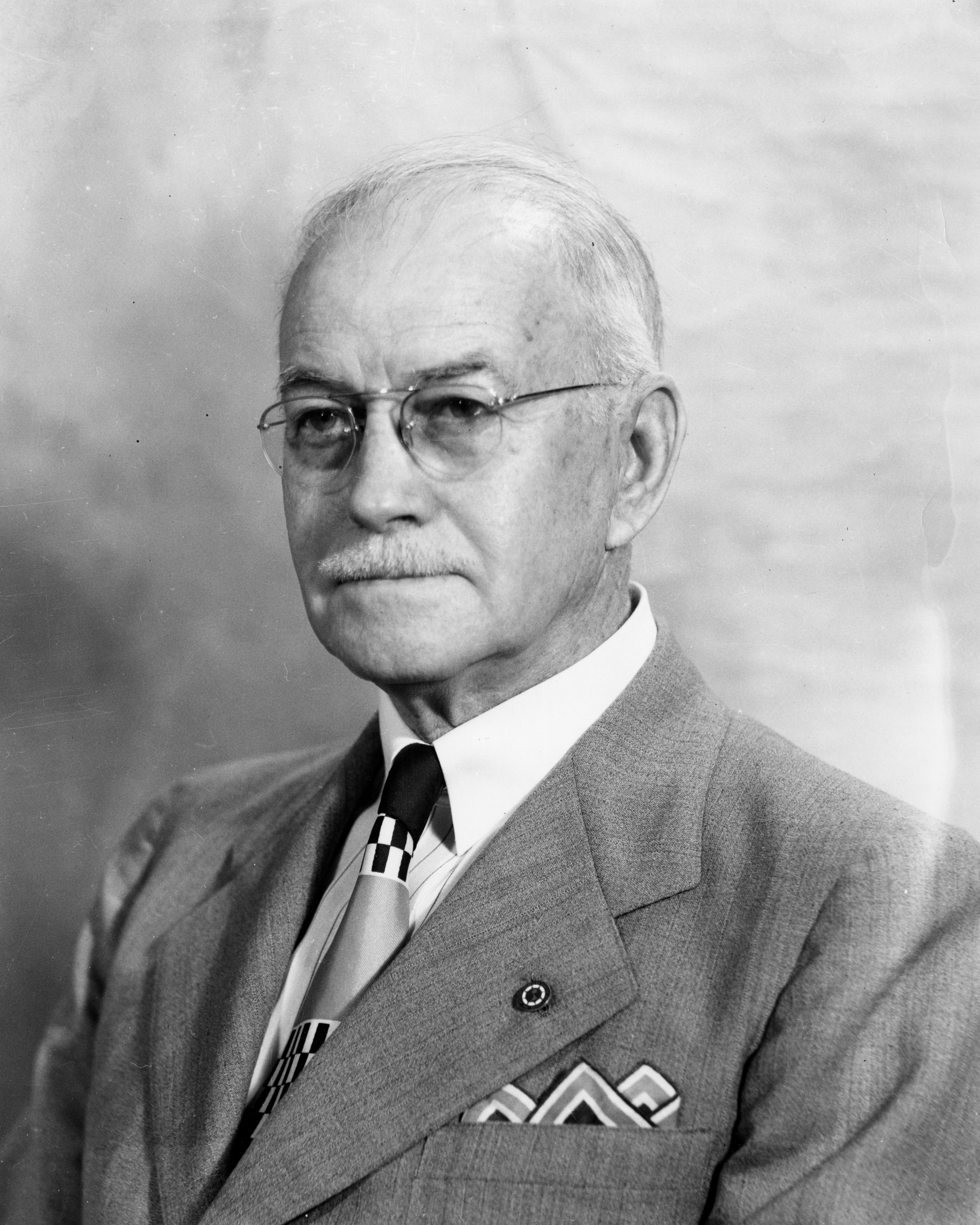
R.T. Evans, 1957

Clarence Dutton started the tradition of naming features in the Grand Canyon after mythological deities and heroic figures. King Arthur Castle was named in 1902 by Richard Tranter Evans (1881–1966), a cartographer who was mapping the Grand Canyon in the early 1900s, after the legendary fortress Camelot of the Legend of King Arthur, in keeping with his naming theme for other geographical features in the vicinity, e.g. Guinevere Castle, Elaine Castle, Excalibur, Gawain Abyss, Bedivere Point, Lancelot Point, Holy Grail Temple, and Galahad Point. This feature's name was officially adopted in 1908 by the U.S. Board on Geographic Names. Evans Butte, located three miles southwest of King Arthur Castle, is named after this same Richard T. Evans, who was a François E. Matthes protégé.

Guinevere Castle (elevation 7,281 ft), connected to King Arthur Castle by a high ridge, is named for Guinevere, the wife and queen of King Arthur. It was also named by Evans, and officially adopted in 1908.

The first ascent of King Arthur Castle was made in 1961 by Merrel Clubb, on his third attempt at it. It took him four days to climb it and was his final climb in the canyon. Harvey Butchart climbed both King Arthur Castle and Guinevere Castle on August 25, 1965, marking the 34th and 35th of the 83 summits he would climb in the Grand Canyon.

== Geology ==
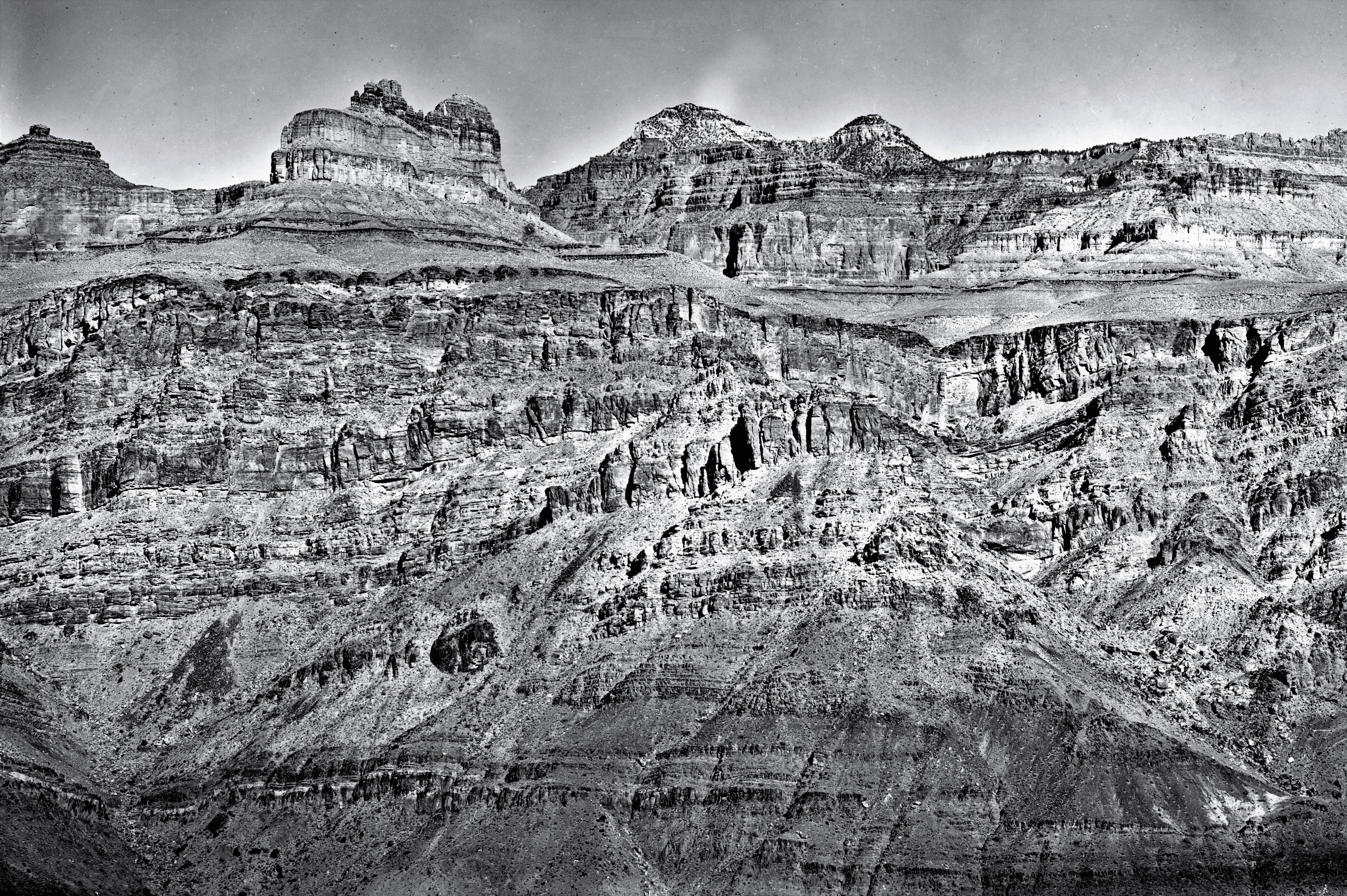
King Arthur Castle centered, Guinevere to right, Dox Castle to left. circa 1901

The summit is composed of Permian Kaibab Limestone and cream-colored Permian Coconino Sandstone. This sandstone, which is the third-youngest stratum in the Grand Canyon, was deposited 265 million years ago as sand dunes. Below the Coconino Sandstone is reddish slope-forming, Permian Hermit Formation, which in turn overlays the Pennsylvanian-Permian Supai Group. Further down are strata of the cliff-forming Mississippian Redwall Limestone, Cambrian Tonto Group, and finally Proterozoic Unkar Group at creek level.

== See also ==
- Geology of the Grand Canyon area
