= Virginia Dox =

American missionary and explorer

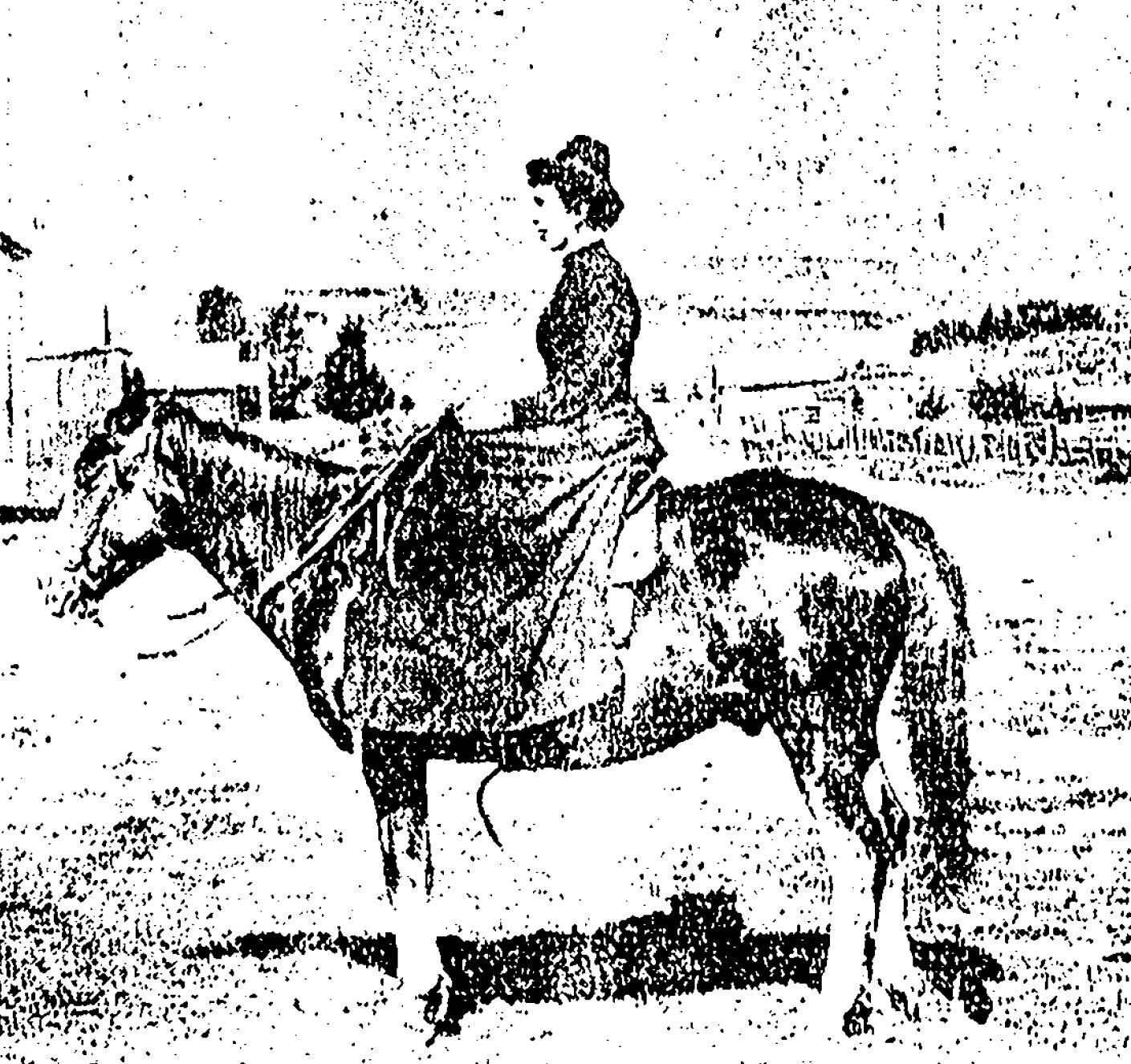
Virginia Dox on her pony in Oxford, Idaho in 1885.

Virginia Dox (October 31, 1851 – February 14, 1941) was a 19th-century American missionary, educator, and explorer in the Intermountain West, and later a noted public speaker and fundraiser for educational institutions including Whitman College and Berea College. Under the auspices of the New West Education Commission, she founded schools in Idaho and New Mexico. She was the first white woman to explore the Grand Canyon, and also the first white woman to visit the Havasupai. Her vivid depictions of Western life earned her the nickname of "the female Bret Harte".

In the course of her travels, Dox lived among 23 Native American tribes. She was an adopted member of nine tribes: the Old Town Penobscot, Delaware, and Osage, and the Six Nations of the Iroquois Confederacy: the Mohawk, Oneida, Onondaga, Cayuga, Seneca and Tuscarora. She became a faculty member of Whitman College, in recognition of her fundraising work, but was prevented from taking the position by a sudden decline in health.

== Early life and education ==
Virginia Dox was born in Wilson, New York on October 31, 1851, the sixth of an eventual nine children of Susan Yates and Eldert Van Woert Dox. She received her primary education in Wilson. For secondary education, she initially attended the union school in nearby Lockport, New York, followed by Claverack Seminary. However, she eventually headed to northwestern Illinois to complete her studies at the Mount Carroll Seminary, later known as Shimer College.

Dox graduated from the collegiate course of the Mount Carroll Seminary in 1875. She was one of a graduating class of eleven, then the largest in the school's history. After graduating, Dox stayed on as an instructor of English and music, until at least 1877. She also studied medicine during this period under Seminary physician and naturalist Henry Shimer, and continued these studies independently after leaving Mount Carroll and returning home. Upon returning to Wilson, she served as preceptress of the union school there.

Miss V. Dox .... has been continuing the study of medicine with the untiring zeal that has always characterized her.

Intending to become a physician, Dox studied medicine the University of Michigan from 1880 to 1881. However, failing health forced her to abandon these studies, and she returned to Wilson once again. As she waited for her health to recover, she busied herself with writing and ornithology.

== Educational and missionary career ==
The Indians never harmed me, because I was brave. They respect a brave man but they respect a brave white woman a thousand times more for they believe all white women are cowards.
—Virginia Dox, c. 1885

Dox worked for the New West Education Commission (NWEC) for six years. The NWEC was a Congregationalist missionary organization founded in 1880. Dox's NWEC career began in December 1883, when the Commission sent her to the remote town of Oxford, Idaho to establish a school.

In Oxford, Dox was the "pioneer pedagogue" for a school to be known as the New West Academy (a name it shared many others founded by the Commission). The town of Oxford, Idaho was then much more populous than it is today, with some 250 inhabitants, but extremely remote. It had however been reached by the Utah and Northern Railway a few years before, in 1879, and was even home to a newspaper, the Idaho Enterprise (which later removed to Malad City). Almost all the inhabitants were Mormon, and there was also a preexisting Mormon school; however, Dox was able to draw more than thirty students for the new Academy, and the school continued to function for some time even after her departure. After more than a year in Oxford, she slipped and injured her leg badly, requiring surgery, but her students dissuaded her from abandoning the school by arranging the classrooms so that they would move around her instead of she around them, and providing a pony for her to get around the town. The kindness of the "uncouth" people of Oxford became a frequent topic in Dox's later speeches.

In 1885, Dox was sent by the US government to the Osage Indian Boarding School at Pawhuska in present-day Oklahoma. Her predecessor there had beaten an Osage youth to death, not an uncommon atrocity in these institutions. As a result, she faced considerable hostility upon her arrival; this was alleviated when she was adopted as a daughter by the principal chief of the Osage, James Bigheart. Bigheart gave her an Osage name that was a partial translation of her Tuscarora name, meaning "Shining Light".

Dox later worked for the NWEC in the Spanish-speaking village of San Mateo, New Mexico for a period variously described as three months, nine months, and "the entire school year". Here she met a much stiffer resistance than she had in Oxford. Her later stories about this period often focused on her difficult plight in the village, with a local priest scheming against her and a wealthy rancher trying to starve her out, and on the peculiar practices of the community's Penitentes, but also mentioned the kindness of the local women who saved her from starvation and gave her gifts on her departure.

Subsequently, Dox was one of several teachers who, after "tried experience" working for the NWEC, were tasked with going on speaking tours in the East to raise funds and support for the Commission's work. This led naturally to Dox's subsequent career as a public speaker for educational causes. She made her first eastern tour in 1888. She then returned to New Mexico for a time, working for the NWEC in the suburbs of Albuquerque.

During her time in the Southwest, Dox was an early explorer of the Grand Canyon, where she was guided by William Bass in 1891. She was the first white woman to visit the Havasupai nation. The "Dox Castle" outcropping and the related bright red Dox Sandstone formation are named for her, supposedly in tribute to her bright red hair. She in turn gave the nearby Holy Grail Temple its original name, "Bass Tomb", after her guide. After emerging from the Grand Canyon, Dox wrote that "in all the wide, wide world there can be nothing more wonderful and beautiful."

== Fundraising and publicity career ==
It is faint praise to say that but for the labors of this gifted, eccentric, indomitable woman the first financial campaign of Whitman College would have ended in failure or been long delayed.
—Stephen Penrose

Dox's work on behalf of Whitman College began around 1896, when she was contacted by a Whitman supporter, Dr. O.W. Nixon of the Chicago Inter-Ocean. Although she had never visited the school, Dox went on speaking tours across the East and Midwest, seeking donations large and small, sometimes giving five speeches in a single day. Her work raised $250,000 for Whitman's Pearson Memorial Endowment. She is sometimes credited with the school's ability to survive its first financial crisis and continue into the 20th century. Dox was rewarded with an appointment to the Whitman College faculty in 1899, but was unable to accept it, as in that year her health took a severe turn for the worse, under the strain of her lecturing work.

Dox also served as a fundraising agent for Berea College in Kentucky, although at a lower level, since only became acquainted with Berea in 1901. Her support was instrumental in gaining for a major gift of $200,000 to Berea by Andrew Carnegie in 1908. The college president William G. Frost had been unable to see Carnegie in the US, but Dox raised funds and encouraged him to travel to Europe, where he was able to meet with Carnegie in Scotland.

== Death and legacy ==
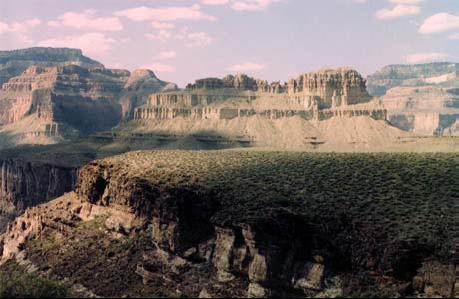
Dox Castle.

Although she had not intended to become a collector, her travels left Dox with a considerable collection of American Indian artwork. Upon realizing the value of this collection upon her return east, she donated it to Bowdoin College in 1893, as the "Virginia Dox Collection of American Antiquities". Bowdoin had been the first men's college to allow her to address its students.

After her health broke in 1899, Dox was incapacitated for five years. She later returned to fundraising and speaking work, but only on a much smaller scale than before. Living quietly in Hartford, Connecticut, Dox gradually slipped into obscurity. A 1932 feature article in the Hartford Courant introduced her as "a forgotten heroine."

Dox died on February 14, 1941, at the age of 89. She was buried in Hartford's Cedar Hill Cemetery. Although of slowly failing health, she had remained healthy enough to hold an open house for her 89th birthday in 1940.

Dox was commemorated with the naming of the Dox wing of Prentiss Hall, a women's dormitory at Whitman College, and in the names of the Dox Castle butte and Dox Sandstone of the Grand Canyon.

== Works cited ==
- Hood, Edmund Lyman (1905). The New West Education Commission 1880-1893. Jacksonville, Fla., The H. & W. B. Drew company.
- Penrose, Stephen B.L. (1935). Whitman: An Unfinished Story. Whitman Publishing Co.
- Wright, Lauren A.; Troxel, Bennie W. (2002). Levi Noble, Geologist. United States Geological Survey.
- "Our Homes". Gleanings in Bee Culture. Vol. 24. December 1896. pp. 866–868.
