= Mount Henry (Montana) =

Mountain in Montana, United States

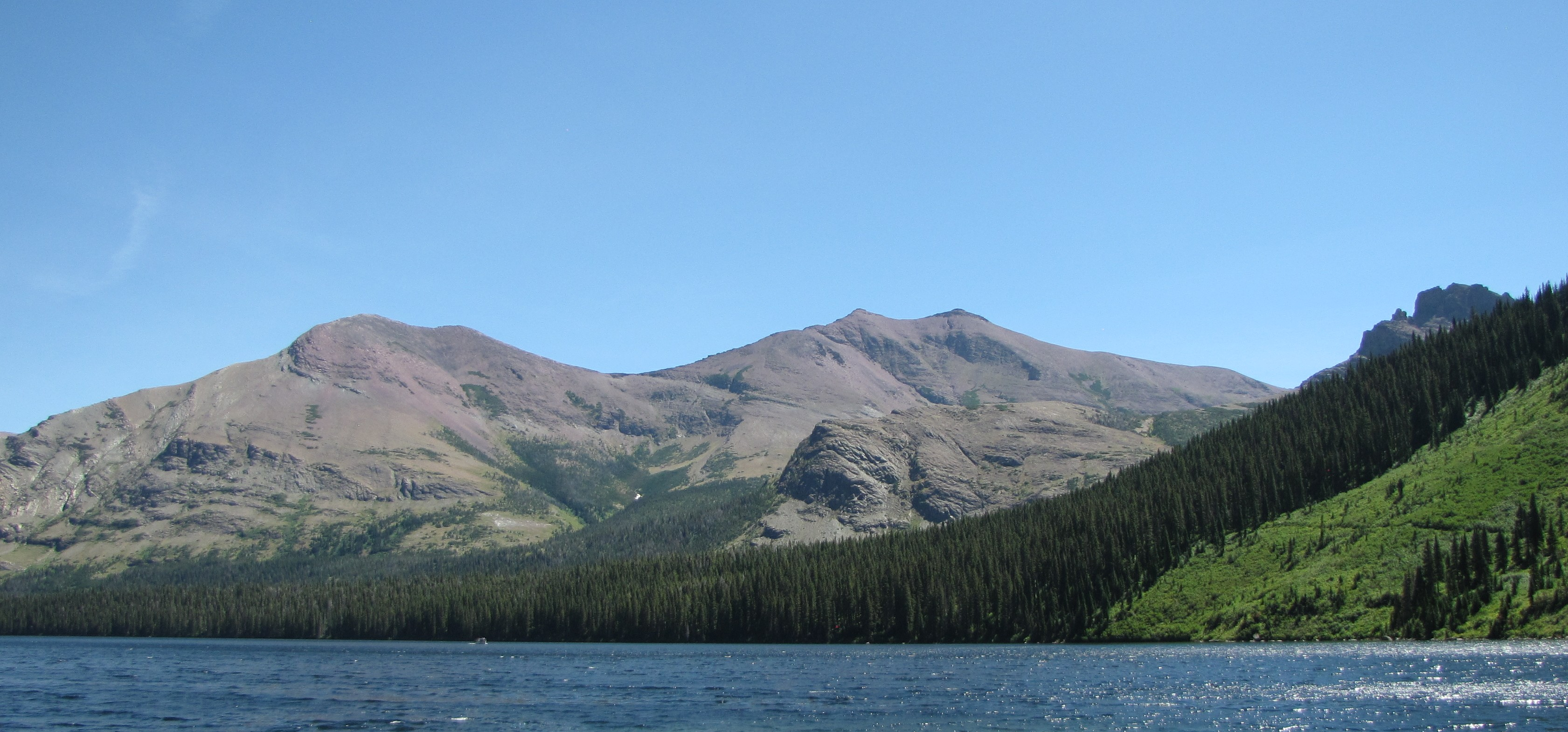
- Appistoki at left and Mount Henry at right rise above Two Medicine Lake

Highest point
- Elevation: 8,852 ft (2,698 m)
- Prominence: 1,367 ft (417 m)
- Coordinates: 48°27′12″N 113°20′36″W

Geography
- Location within Montana Location within the United States
- Location: Glacier County, Montana, U.S.
- Parent range: Lewis Range
- Topo map(s): USGS Squaw Mountain, MT

Mount Henry (8,852 feet (2,698 m)) is located in the Lewis Range, Glacier National Park in the U.S. state of Montana. Mount Henry is just south of Appistoki Peak in the Two Medicine region of the park.

== See also ==
- Mountains and mountain ranges of Glacier National Park (U.S.)
