= Bass Trail =

Bass Trail refers to a pair of hiking trails in Grand Canyon National Park:

- North Bass Trail, accessible from the north rim
- South Bass Trail, accessible from the south rim

== See also ==
- List of trails in Grand Canyon National Park
