= Guinevere Castle =

Landform in the Grand Canyon, Arizona

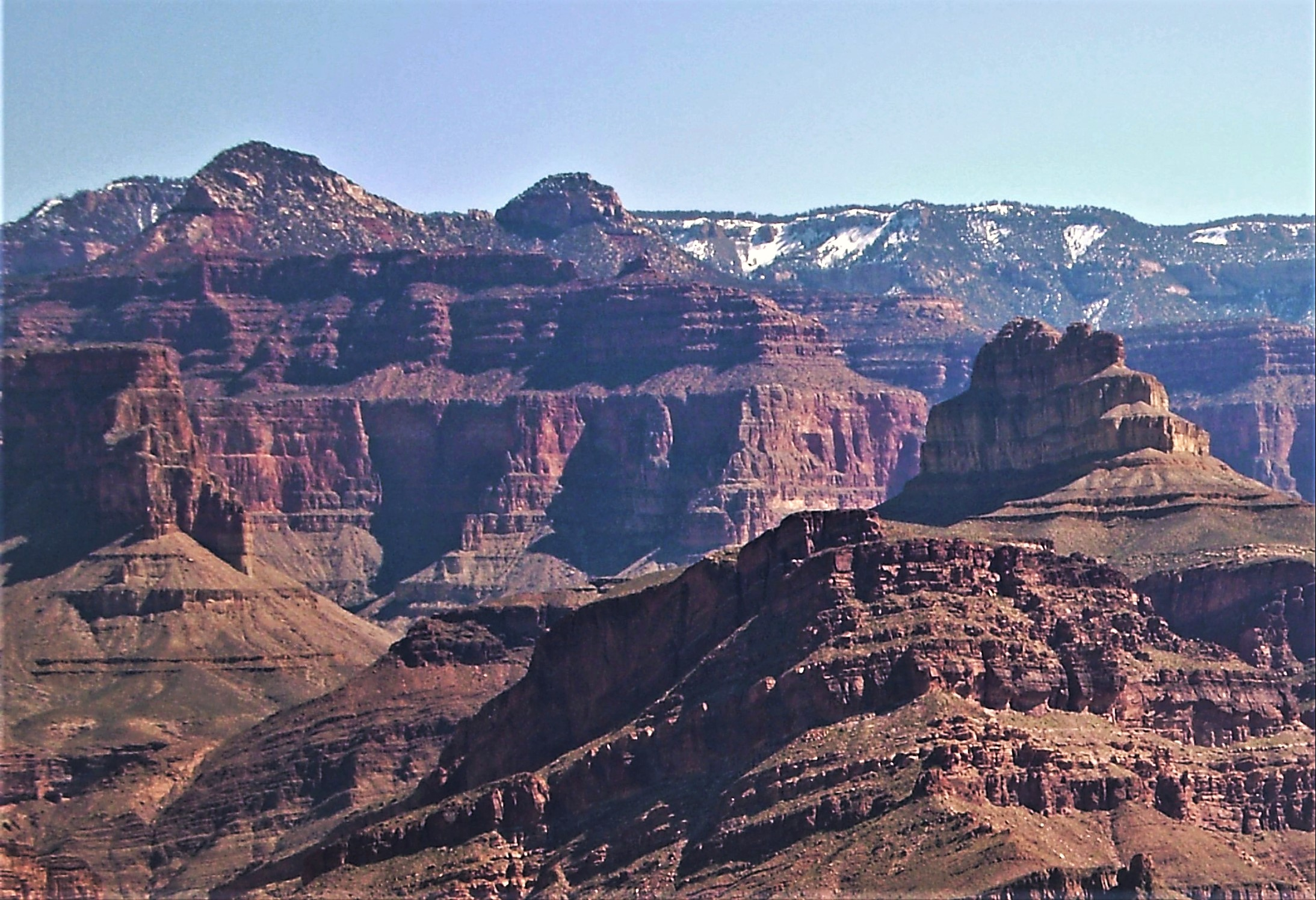
- King Arthur Castle, Guinevere Castle, and Dox Castle from the west.

Highest point
- Elevation: 7,281 ft (2,219 m)
- Prominence: 341 ft (104 m)
- Parent peak: King Arthur Castle (7,344 ft)
- Isolation: 0.45 mi (0.72 km)
- Coordinates: 36°15′35″N 112°15′57″W

Geography
- Location within Arizona Location within the United States
- Country: United States
- State: Arizona
- County: Coconino
- Protected area: Grand Canyon National Park
- Parent range: Kaibab Plateau; Colorado Plateau
- Topo map: USGS King Arthur Castle

Geology
- Rock type(s): limestone, sandstone, mudstone

Climbing
- First ascent: Puebloans

Guinevere Castle is a 7,281-foot-elevation (2,219-meter) summit located in the Grand Canyon, in Coconino County of northern Arizona, US. It is situated one-half mile southeast of King Arthur Castle, one mile west of Excalibur, and 2.5 miles northeast of Evans Butte, within the Shinumo Amphitheater. Topographic relief is significant as it rises 5,000 feet (1,500 meters) above the Colorado River in 4.5 miles (7.2 km), and 2,600 feet above Gawain Abyss in one mile. According to the Köppen climate classification system, Guinevere Castle is located in a cold semi-arid climate zone.

== History ==
Clarence Dutton started the tradition of naming geographical features in the Grand Canyon after mythological deities and heroic figures. Guinevere Castle was named by cartographer Richard Tranter Evans (1881–1966), after Guinevere, queen and wife of King Arthur, in keeping with an Arthurian naming theme for other geographical features in the vicinity, e.g. King Arthur Castle, Elaine Castle, Excalibur, Gawain Abyss, Bedivere Point, Lancelot Point, Holy Grail Temple, and Galahad Point. This feature's name was officially adopted in 1908 by the U.S. Board on Geographic Names. Harvey Butchart climbed both King Arthur Castle and Guinevere Castle on August 25, 1965, placing the first cairn on Guinevere, but was not the first person there as he found evidence that Native Americans had been there, namely a shelter and a granary. King Arthur and Guinevere became the 34th and 35th of the 83 summits Butchart would climb in the Grand Canyon.

== Geology ==
The summit is composed of Permian Kaibab Limestone and cream-colored Permian Coconino Sandstone. This sandstone, which is the third-youngest stratum in the Grand Canyon, was deposited 265 million years ago as sand dunes. Below the Coconino Sandstone is reddish slope-forming, Permian Hermit Formation, which in turn overlays the Pennsylvanian-Permian Supai Group. Further down are strata of the cliff-forming Mississippian Redwall Limestone, and slope-forming Cambrian Tonto Group. Precipitation runoff from Guinevere Castle drains west to the Colorado River via Shinumo Creek.

== See also ==
- Geology of the Grand Canyon area
