= Elaine Castle =

Summit in the Grand Canyon, Arizona

- Location within Arizona Location within the United States

Highest point
- Elevation: 7,431 ft (2,265 m)
- Prominence: 691 ft (211 m)
- Parent peak: Kaibab Plateau (9,220 ft)
- Isolation: 5.38 mi (8.66 km)
- Coordinates: 36°18′17″N 112°17′05″W

Geography
- Country: United States
- State: Arizona
- County: Coconino
- Protected area: Grand Canyon National Park
- Parent range: Colorado Plateau
- Topo map: USGS King Arthur Castle

Geology
- Rock age: Permian
- Rock type: sandstone

Climbing
- First ascent: Puebloans
- Easiest route: South side class 3 scrambling

Elaine Castle is a 7,431-foot-elevation (2,265-meter) summit located in the Grand Canyon, in Coconino County of northern Arizona, US. It is situated three miles north-northwest of King Arthur Castle near the head of Shinumo Creek, and immediately southwest of Lancelot Point. Topographic relief is significant as it rises 2,800 feet (850 meters) above Merlin Abyss in one mile. According to the Köppen climate classification system, Elaine Castle is located in a cold semi-arid climate zone.

== History ==
Clarence Dutton started the tradition of naming geographical features in the Grand Canyon after mythological deities and heroic figures. Elaine Castle was named by cartographer Richard Tranter Evans (1881–1966), after Elaine of Astolat, from the Legend of King Arthur, in keeping with an Arthurian naming theme for other geographical features in the vicinity, e.g. King Arthur Castle, Guinevere Castle, Excalibur, Gawain Abyss, Holy Grail Temple, Bedivere Point, Lancelot Point, and Galahad Point. This feature's name was officially adopted in 1908 by the U.S. Board on Geographic Names. Donald Davis climbed Elaine Castle on June 27, 1969, placing the first cairn on Elaine, but was not the first person there as he found evidence that Native Americans had been there. Harvey Butchart climbed it on August 9, 1969, finding the cairn that Davis had built.

== Geology ==
This butte is composed of a Permian Toroweap Formation caprock on cream-colored Permian Coconino Sandstone. This sandstone, which is the third-youngest stratum in the Grand Canyon, was deposited 265 million years ago as sand dunes. Below the Coconino Sandstone is reddish slope-forming, Permian Hermit Formation, which in turn overlays the Pennsylvanian-Permian Supai Group. Further down are strata of the cliff-forming Mississippian Redwall Limestone, and slope-forming Cambrian Tonto Group. Elaine Castle owes its isolation to lines of fracture. Precipitation runoff from Elaine Castle drains south to the Colorado River via Shinumo Creek.

== See also ==
- Geology of the Grand Canyon area
