= Dox Castle =

Landform in the Grand Canyon, Arizona

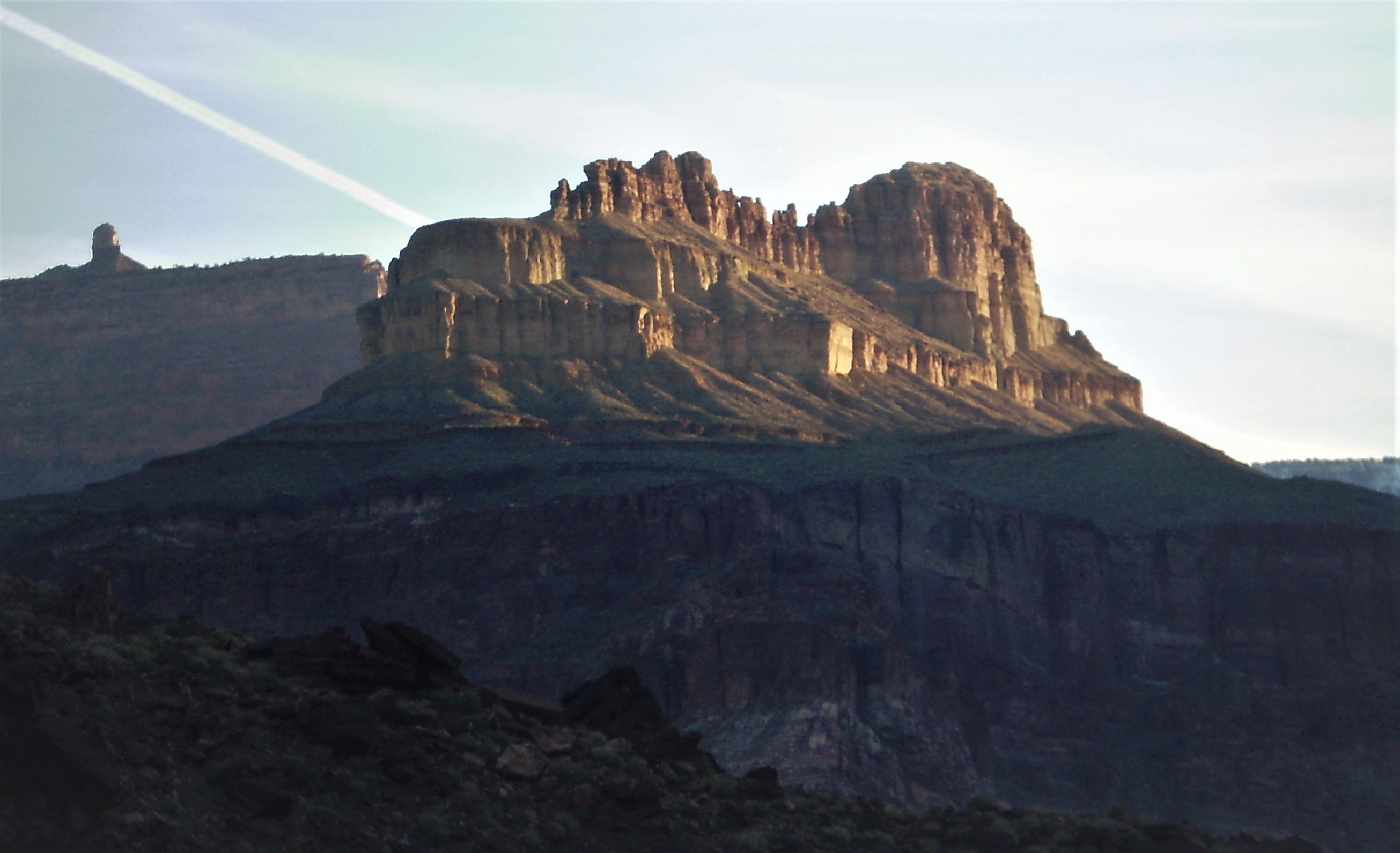
- Southwest aspect at sunrise

Highest point
- Elevation: 4,780 ft (1,460 m)
- Prominence: 760 ft (230 m)
- Parent peak: Evans Butte (6,379 ft)
- Isolation: 2.05 mi (3.30 km)
- Coordinates: 36°14′44″N 112°19′20″W

Naming
- Etymology: Virginia Dox

Geography
- Location within Arizona Location within the United States
- Country: United States
- State: Arizona
- County: Coconino
- Protected area: Grand Canyon National Park
- Parent range: Kaibab Plateau; Colorado Plateau
- Topo map: USGS Havasupai Point

Geology
- Rock type(s): sandstone, siltstone, limestone

Climbing
- Easiest route: class 5.3 climbing

Dox Castle is a 4,780-foot-elevation (1,460-meter) summit located in the Grand Canyon, in Coconino County of northern Arizona, US. It is situated four miles north-northeast of Havasupai Point, two miles northwest of Evans Butte, and 2.5 miles southwest of Holy Grail Temple, where it towers 2,500 feet (760 meters) above the Colorado River.

Dox Castle was named by William Wallace Bass and George Wharton James for Virginia Dox (1851–1941), who was the first white woman to visit this part of the Grand Canyon in 1891. Holy Grail Temple was originally named Bass Tomb by Virginia Dox, for William Bass, Dox's guide into the canyon. Impressed by her, Bass named Dox Castle shortly after she left. This butte's name was officially adopted in 1908 by the U.S. Board on Geographic Names. According to the Köppen climate classification system, Dox Castle is located in a cold semi-arid climate zone, with precipitation runoff draining west to the Colorado River via Shinumo Creek.

Dox Castle is composed of Cambrian rock from the Tonto Group, overlaying the Proterozoic Unkar Group at river level. Levi F. Noble named the Dox Formation because of exposures in a tributary to Shinumo Creek below Dox Castle.

== Gallery ==
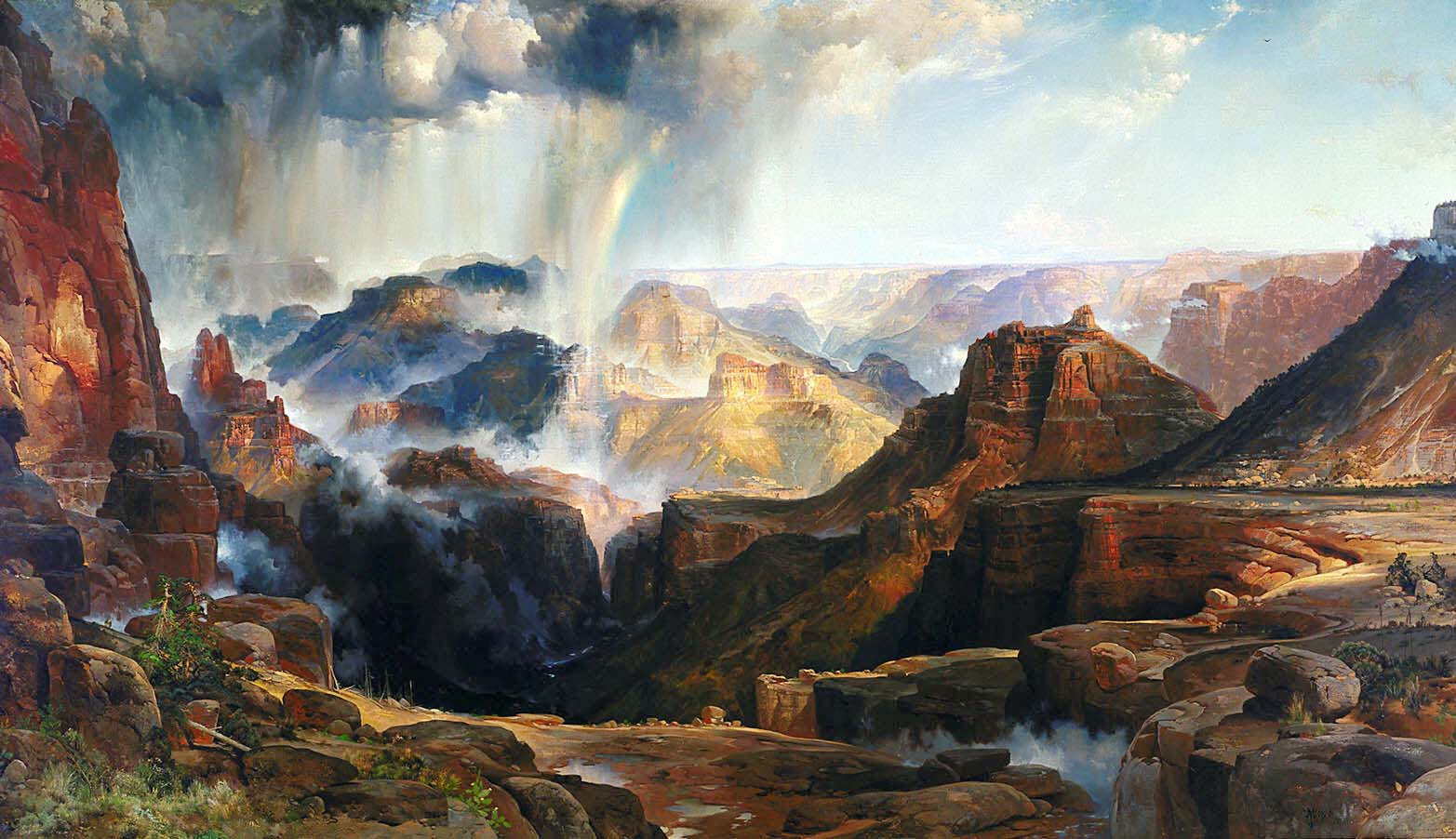
Dox Castle is centered in bullseye of this famous painting by Thomas Moran.
"Chasm of the Colorado" (1873–74), a large canvas measuring 7 feet high by 12 feet wide, hung prominently in the US Capitol for over a half-century.

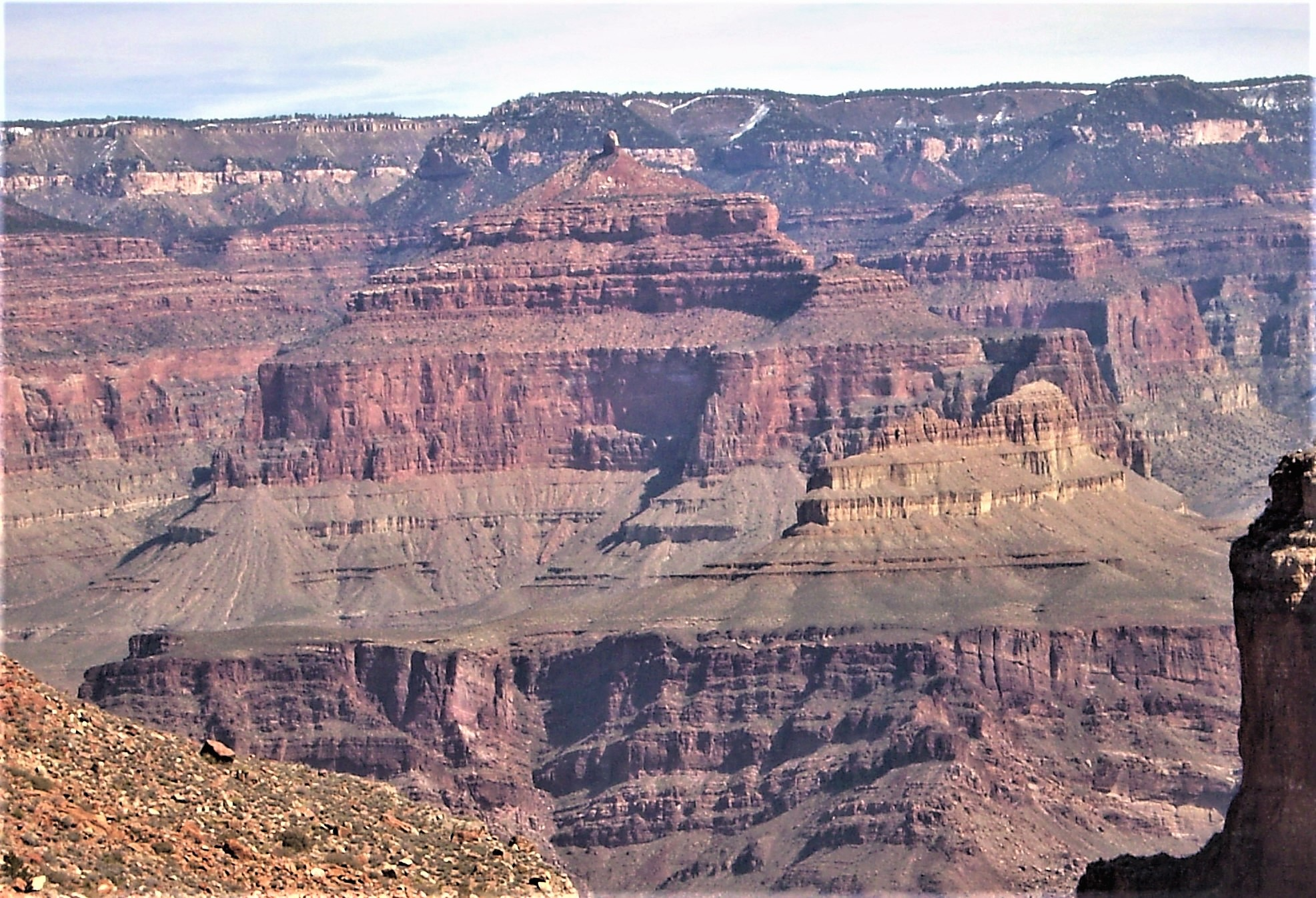
Holy Grail Temple centered with Dox Castle below to right, from southwest

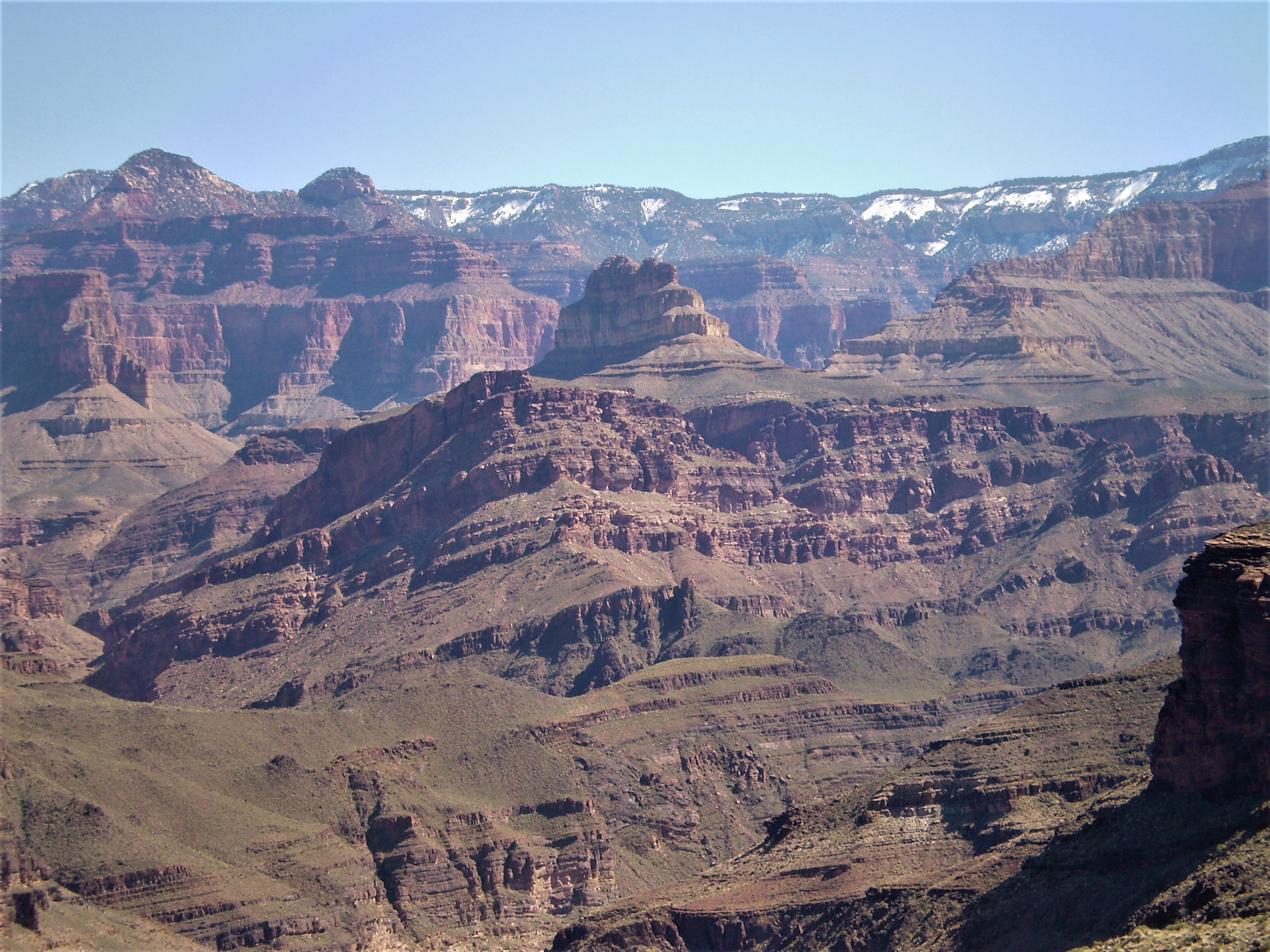
Dox Castle centered, King Arthur Castle upper left. From the west.

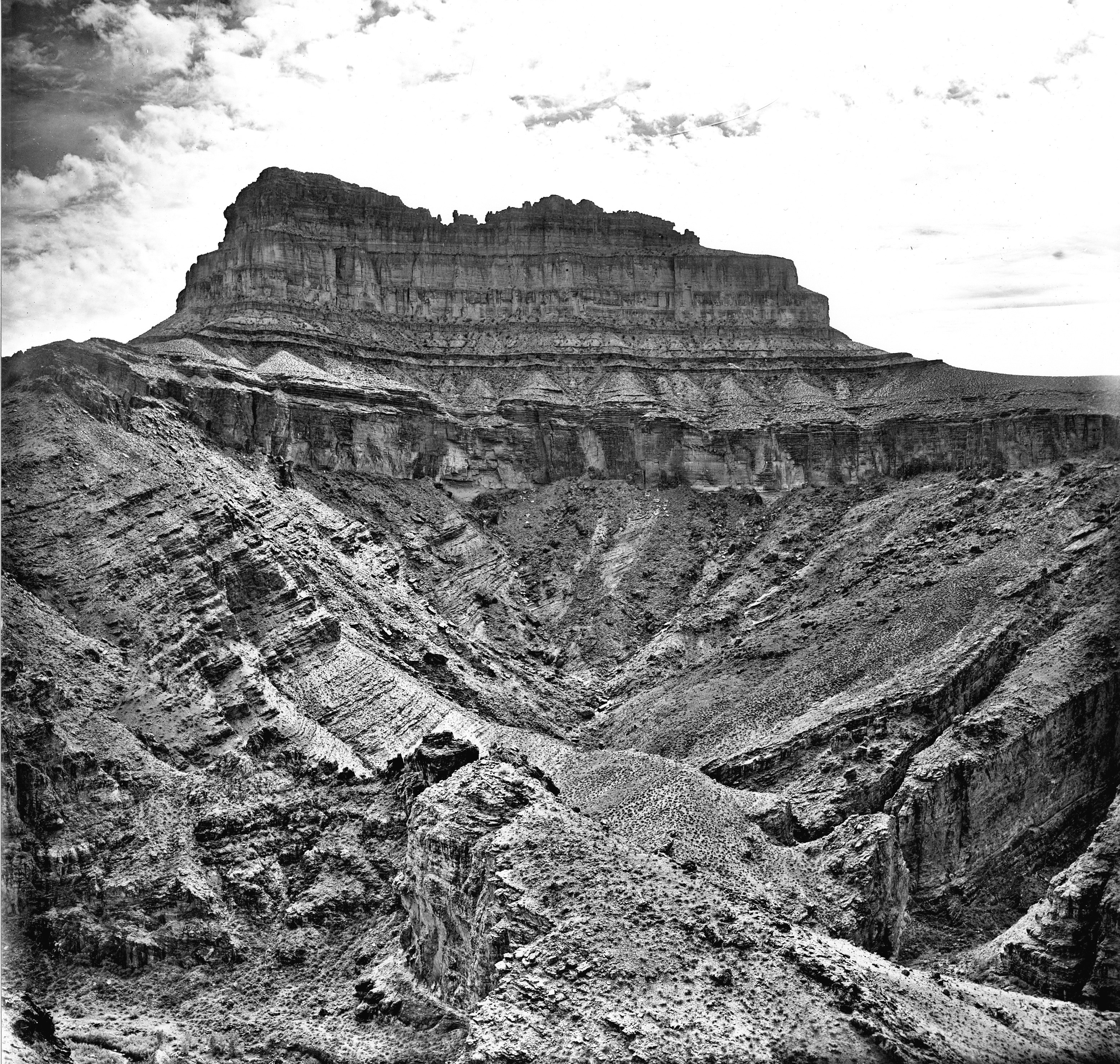
North aspect, 1901

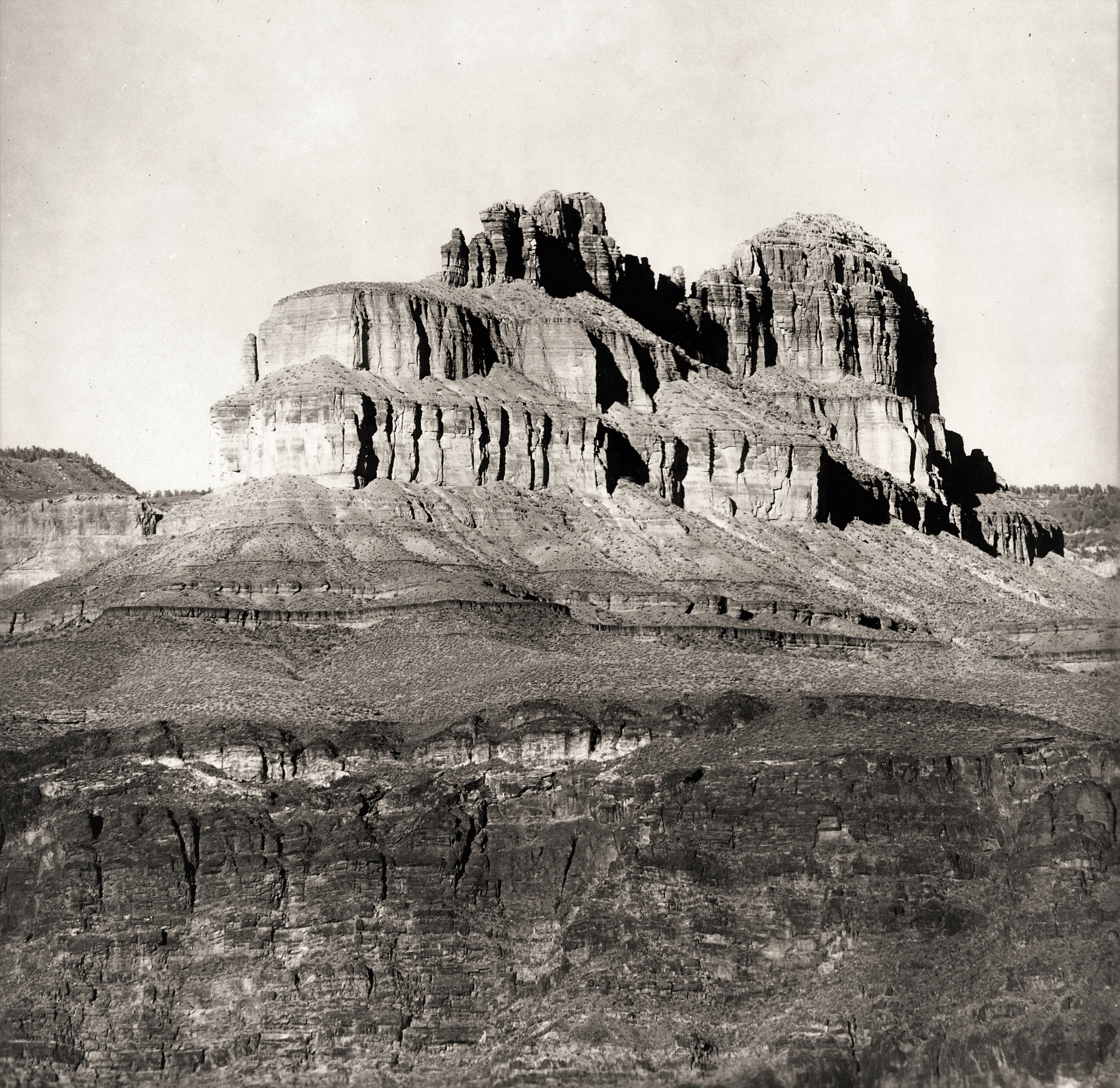
Dox Castle circa 1901

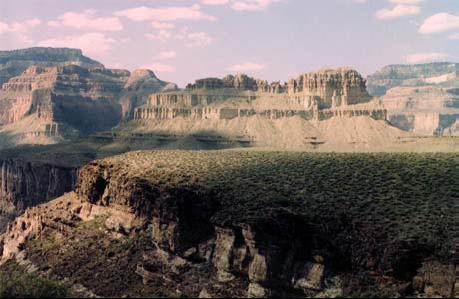

== See also ==
- Geology of the Grand Canyon area
