= Castor Temple =

Landform in the Grand Canyon, Arizona

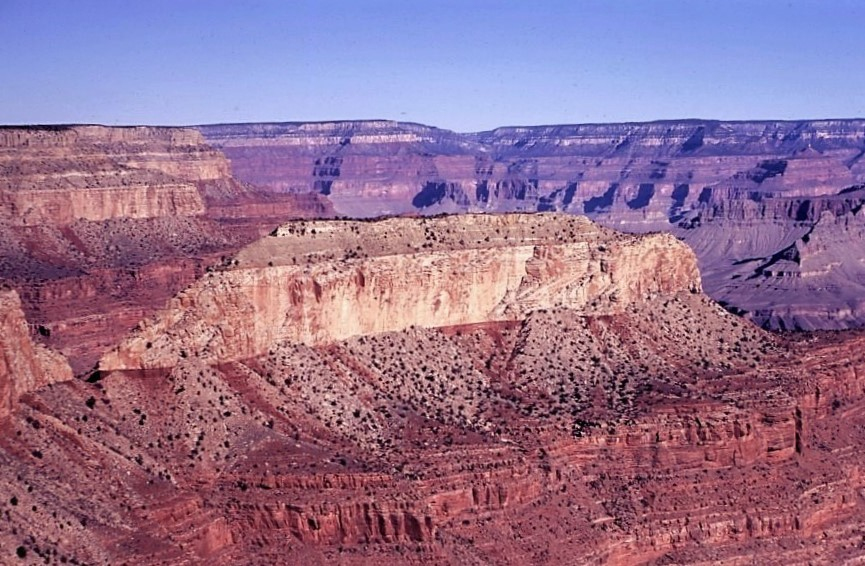
- Southeast aspect, from Jicarilla Point

Highest point
- Elevation: 6,221 ft (1,896 m)
- Prominence: 581 ft (177 m)
- Parent peak: Pollux Temple (6,251 ft)
- Isolation: 1.07 mi (1.72 km)
- Coordinates: 36°07′44″N 112°19′07″W

Geography
- Location within Arizona Location within the United States
- Country: United States
- State: Arizona
- County: Coconino
- Protected area: Grand Canyon National Park
- Parent range: Coconino Plateau; Colorado Plateau
- Topo map: USGS Havasupai Point

Geology
- Rock type(s): limestone, sandstone, mudstone

Climbing
- First ascent: 1971
- Easiest route: class 4 climbing

Castor is a 6,221-foot-elevation (1,896-meter) summit located in the Grand Canyon, in Coconino County of northern Arizona, United States. It is situated 11 miles west-northwest of Grand Canyon Village, and less than one mile north of Piute Point. Pollux Temple is one mile southeast, and Geikie Peak is three miles to the east. Topographic relief is significant as Castor Temple rises over 3,800 feet (1,200 meters) above the Colorado River in two miles.

Castor Temple is named for Castor, the twin half-brother of Pollux according to Greek mythology. In ancient Rome, the Temple of Castor and Pollux was in close proximity to the Temple of Vesta, and in the Grand Canyon, Vesta Temple is situated less than four miles to the southeast. Clarence Dutton began the tradition of naming geographical features in the Grand Canyon after mythological deities. This geographical feature's name was officially adopted in 1964 by the U.S. Board on Geographic Names.

According to the Köppen climate classification system, Castor Temple is located in a Cold semi-arid climate zone. Access to this feature is via the Tonto Trail, and the first ascent of the summit was made April 19, 1971, by Donald Davis and Alan Doty.

== Geology ==
Castor Temple is capped by a thin ledge with trees, the Brady Canyon Member of the Permian Toroweap Formation, which overlies the Seligman Member, also Toroweap. Below is conspicuous, cream-colored, cliff-former Coconino Sandstone, which is the third-youngest of the strata in the Grand Canyon, and was deposited 265 million years ago as sand dunes. The Coconino overlays Permian Hermit Formation (reddish slope), Esplanade Sandstone (red ledges), and Wescogame and Manakacha Formations of the Pennsylvanian-Permian Supai Group. Further down are strata of the cliff-forming Mississippian Redwall Limestone, and finally the Cambrian Tonto Group. Precipitation runoff from Castor Temple drains northeast to the Colorado River via Turquoise and Sapphire Canyons.

== See also ==
- Geology of the Grand Canyon area
- Scorpion Ridge
