= Topaz Canyon =

Landform in the Grand Canyon, Arizona

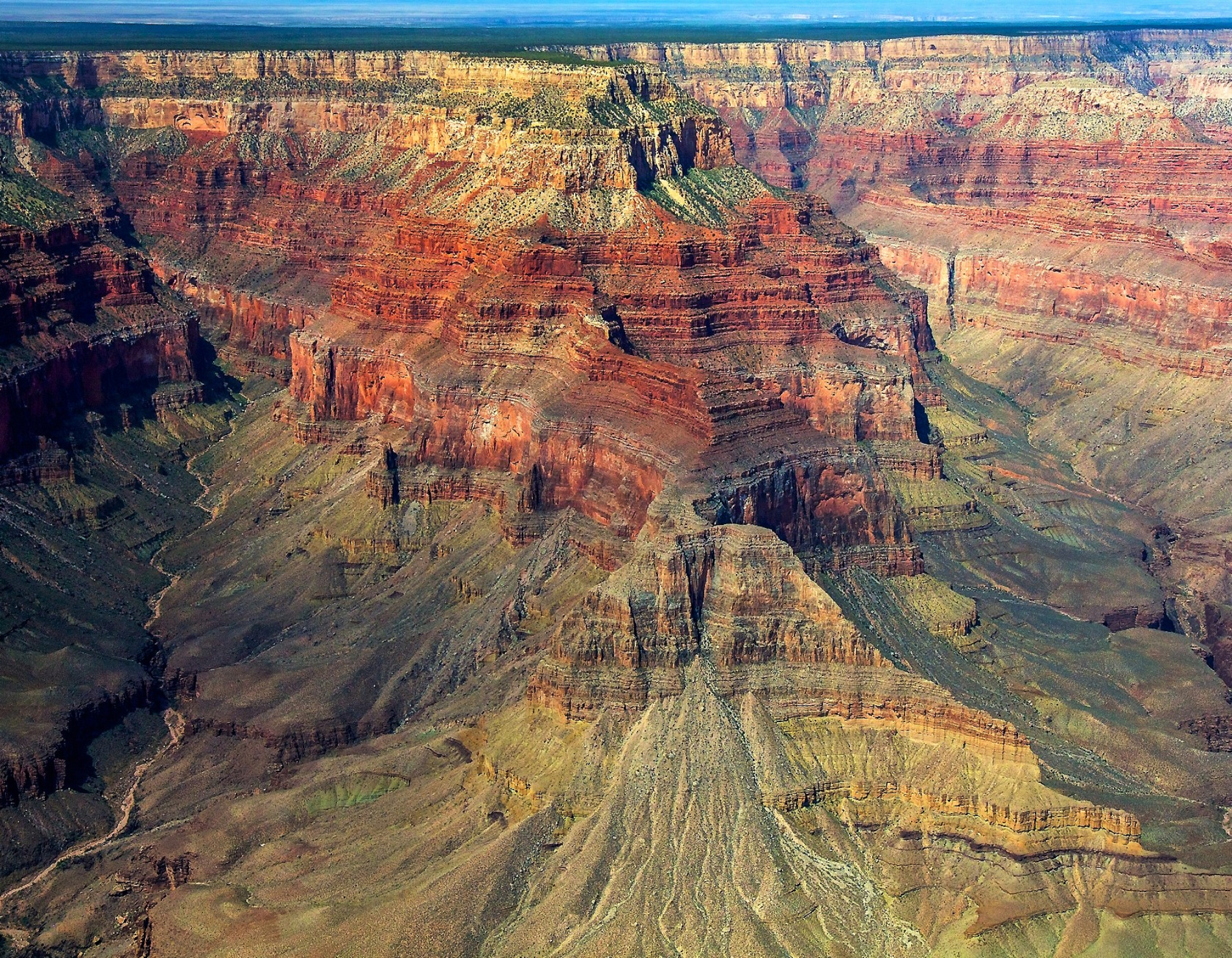
- Topaz Canyon-(left), Slate Canyon-(right) (center)-Diana Temple, with Marsh Butte at its northeast terminus

- Location within Arizona
- Floor elevation: 2,654 ft (809 m)
- Length: ~4.0 mi southwest-northeast

Geography
- Location: (west)-Grand Canyon, (northern)-Arizona, United States
- Coordinates: 36°06′37″N 112°14′31″W
- Topo map: Grand Canyon, USGS
- Rivers: Topaz Creek
- Interactive map of Topaz Canyon

Topaz Canyon is a linear, narrow canyon in the western Grand Canyon, below the South Rim. It lies in a region of four canyons, and a fifth smaller canyon, all trending mostly northeasterly towards the west-flowing Colorado River, in western Grand Canyon National Park. The name of Topaz Canyon was named by the Board of Geographical Names for precious stones of the region. Topaz Canyon is the southeast border of the linear, and major, forested-landform, Diana Temple; (Slate Canyon is Diana Temple’s northwest border).

The northeast terminus of Topaz Canyon intersects with the outfall of Boucher Canyon and the tract of the Tonto Trail (west region). The Boucher Trail starting in Hermit Canyon, (just east of Eremita Mesa), ends at the termini of both Topaz and Boucher Canyons.

The middle and lower regions of Topaz Canyon are in slopes and rocks of the Tonto Group. The major visible section of Topaz Canyon are the dull-greenish slopes of the Bright Angel Shale. Northeast and closer to the Colorado River are short, erosion-resistant cliffs of Tapeats Sandstone. The sandstone is the Tonto Platform, (also the Great Unconformity, of lost time, ~1,000 million years, and probable lost eroded rock units), the horizontal platform that the Tonto Trail traverses. The upper cliffs of the canyon are rock units of Kaibab Limestone, Toroweap Formation, Coconino Sandstone, and Hermit Shale, down to Supai Group on red-cliffs of Redwall Limestone. These are the rock units northwest on Diana Temple. Vesta Temple southeast between Topaz Canyon and Boucher Canyon, has the upper units of rock mostly removed; but Vesta Temple has a remainder, eroded cliff of Kaibab Limestone, on a shelf of Toroweap Formation, on the upper platform of the non-erosive cliff-former, Coconino Sandstone.

== Topaz Canyon watershed ==
The watershed of Topaz Canyon is a twin-canyon watershed. Vesta Temple lies between Topaz Canyon, northwest, and Boucher Canyon southeast. The headwaters, west, of Topaz Canyon are from Mescalero Point, at the saddle between Diana Temple; the headwaters east (Boucher Canyon), are from Mimbreno Point, and east from the northwest flank of Eremita Mesa, part of the South Rim. Boucher Creek receives Topaz Creek, and the Boucher Creek outfall into west-flowing Colorado River, creates the Boucher Rapids.

== Geography/geology ==
=== Diana Temple and Mescalero Point ===
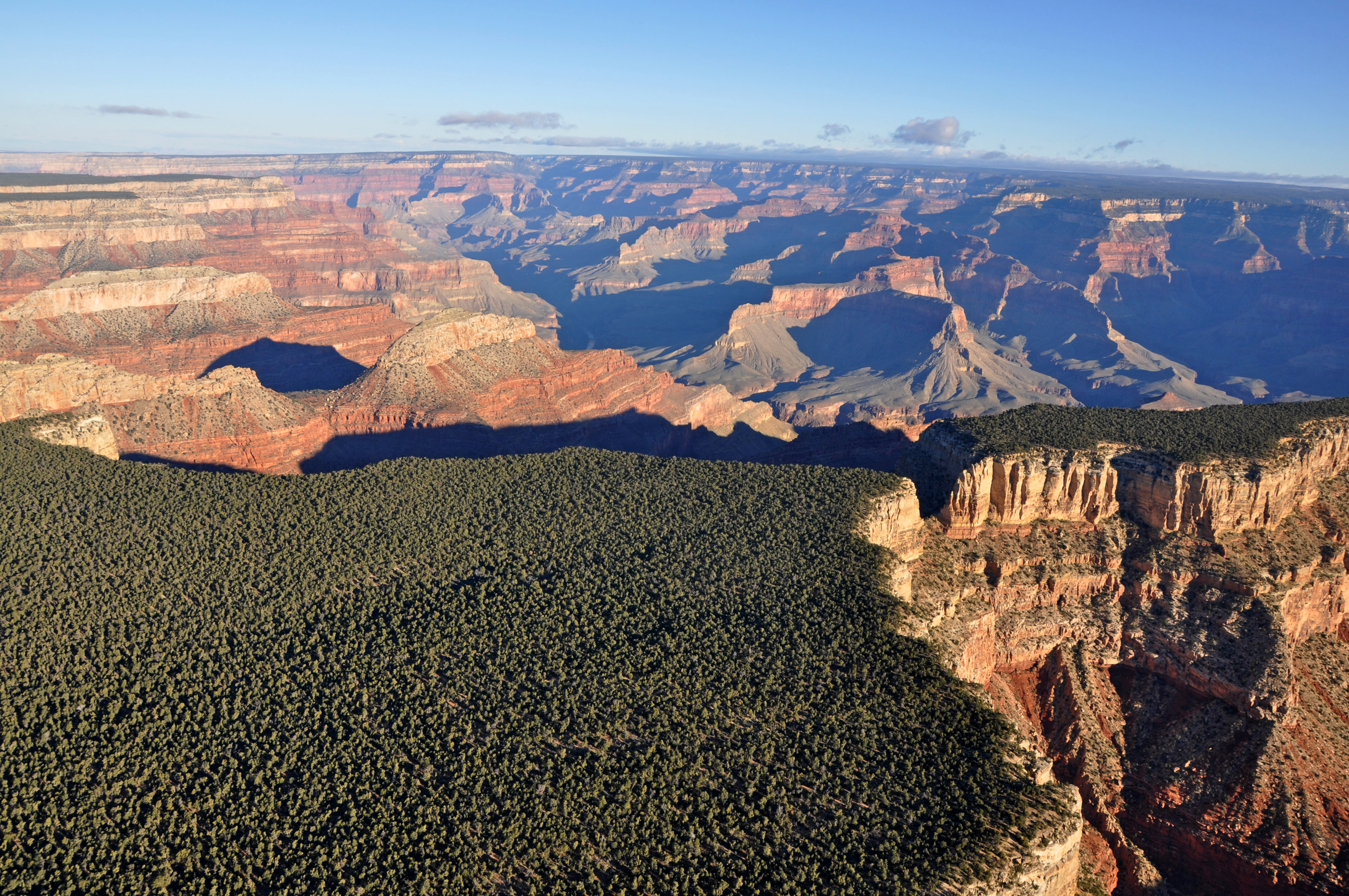

The Upper Topaz Canyon watershed starts at an arcuate section of the South Rim, with Mescalero Point at the southwest (Mimbreno Point at the southeast), and a short saddle below Mescalero Point to Diana Temple. The saddle is only about 1/16 mile distant, and descends down to the upper platform of the resistant Coconino Sandstone. Diana Temple is only about 1.0 mi long, but the eroded ridgeline of Supai Group extends northeast on a platform/shelf of Supai unit 2, the cliff-former Manakacha Formation. The upper platform below of the Redwall Limestone (also a cliff and platform-former), extends further, and is separated at its terminus from Marsh Butte, a remnant eroded cliff of Redwall.

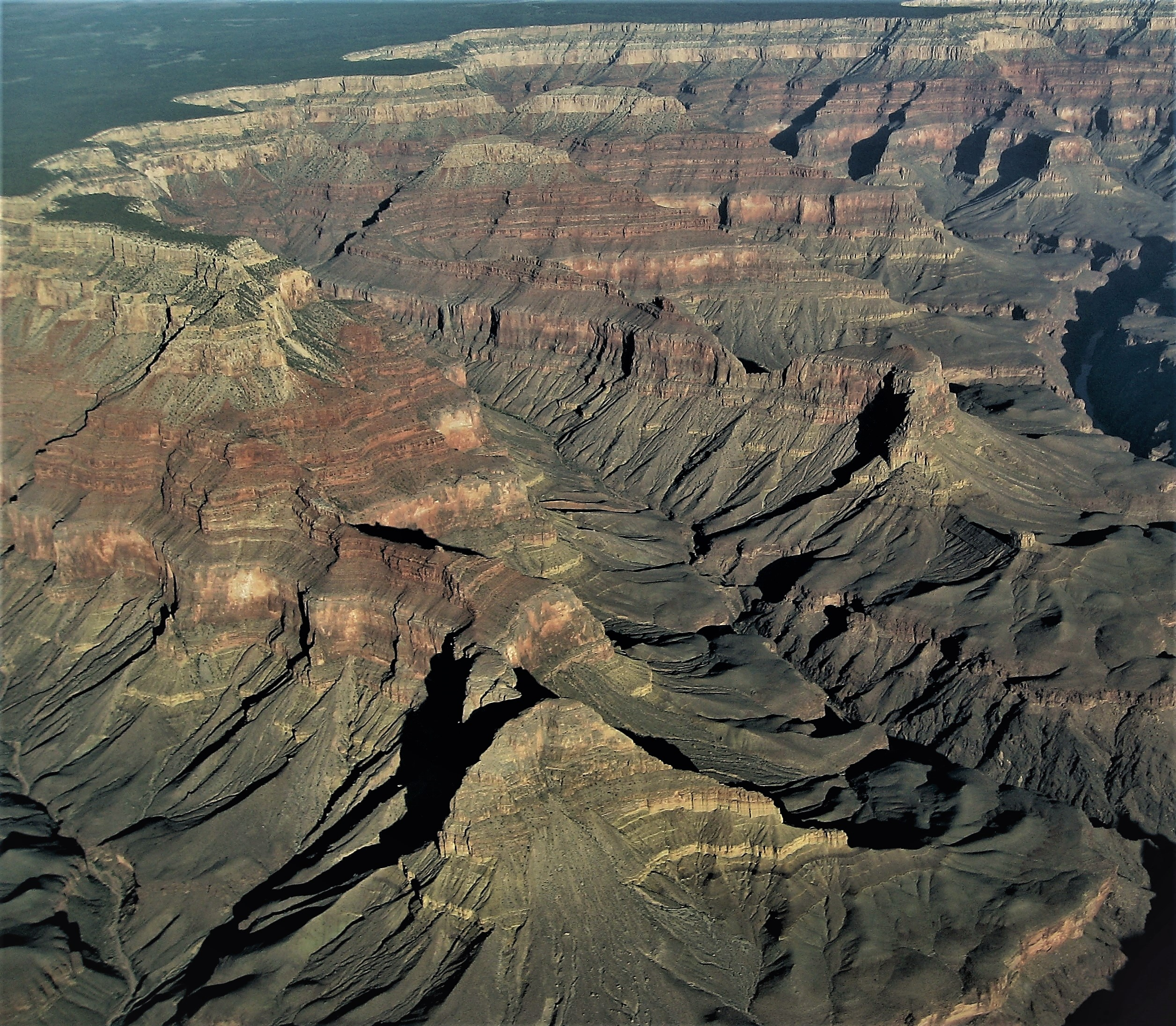
Topaz Canyon-(bottom left, Slate Canyon-(center) geology of the canyons: Reds of Supai Group & Redwall Limestone, and dull-greenish slopes of Bright Angel Shale

=== Vesta Temple and Mimbreno Point ===
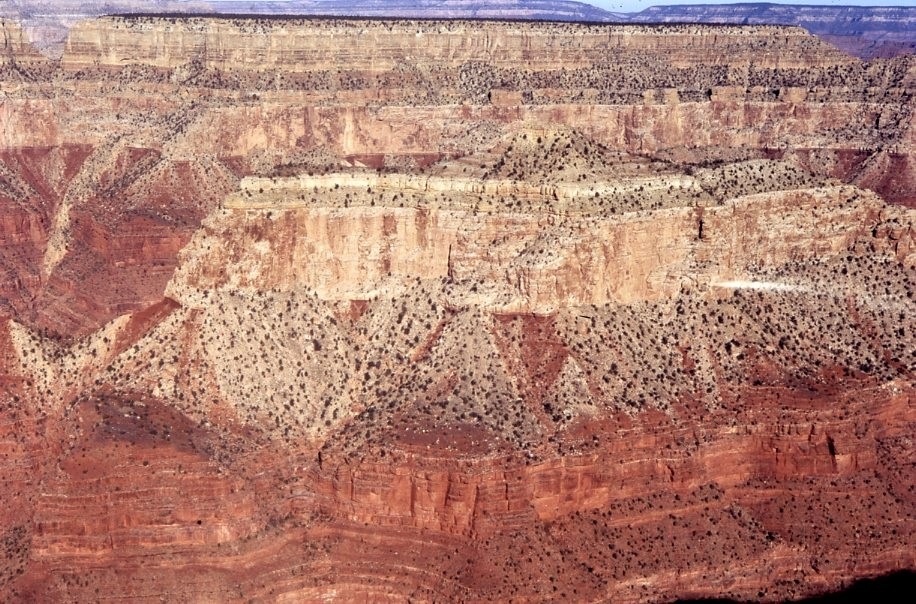
(linear)-Vesta Temple in front of Diana Temple

At the southeast of Upper Topaz Canyon is Mimbreno Point and a saddle, about 1/4 mi distant (the saddle upon Supai Group, unit 4 of 4, the platform and cliff-former, resistant Esplanade Sandstone), to Vesta Temple, which trends southwest-to-northeast. Vesta Temple is half the length of Diana Temple, with the same tall cliffs of Coconino Sandstone, on Hermit Formation, on Supai Group, and Redwall Limestone below. The prominence of Vesta is only a remainder cliff (actually, a cliff, but in the shape of a sloping cupola), of Kaibab Limestone on a shelf of Toroweap Formation, and with only sparse vegetation, unlike forested and vegetated Diana Temple.

== Gallery ==
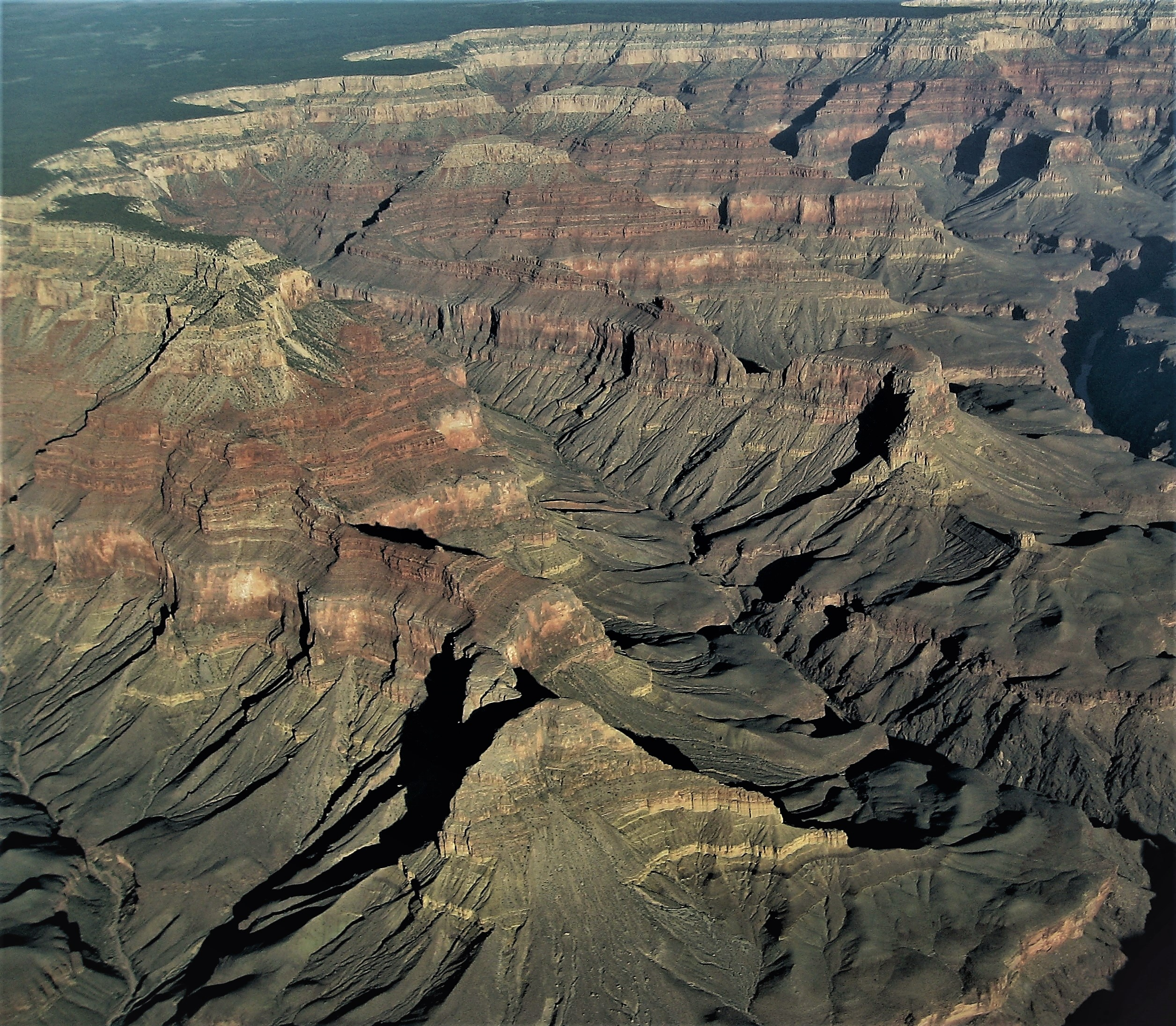
(forested)-Diana Temple (left),
Topaz Canyon (bottom left)
(Slate Canyon at center)

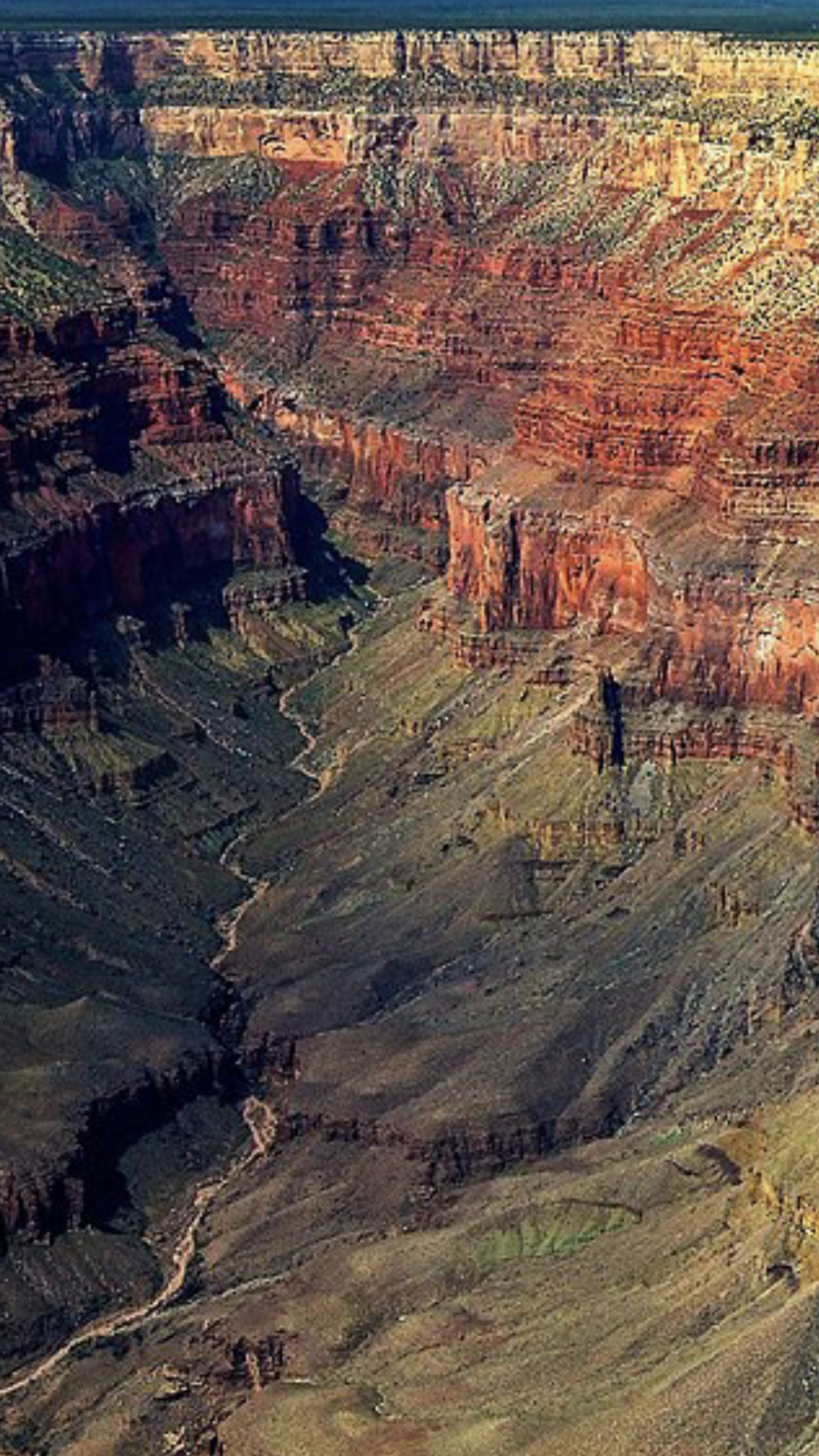
Lower Topaz Canyon & west flank geology, (which is east aspect of Diana Temple ridgeline extension)

== See also ==
- Geology of the Grand Canyon area
- Hermit Canyon
- Tuna Canyon
