= Mescalero Point =

Landform in the Grand Canyon, Arizona

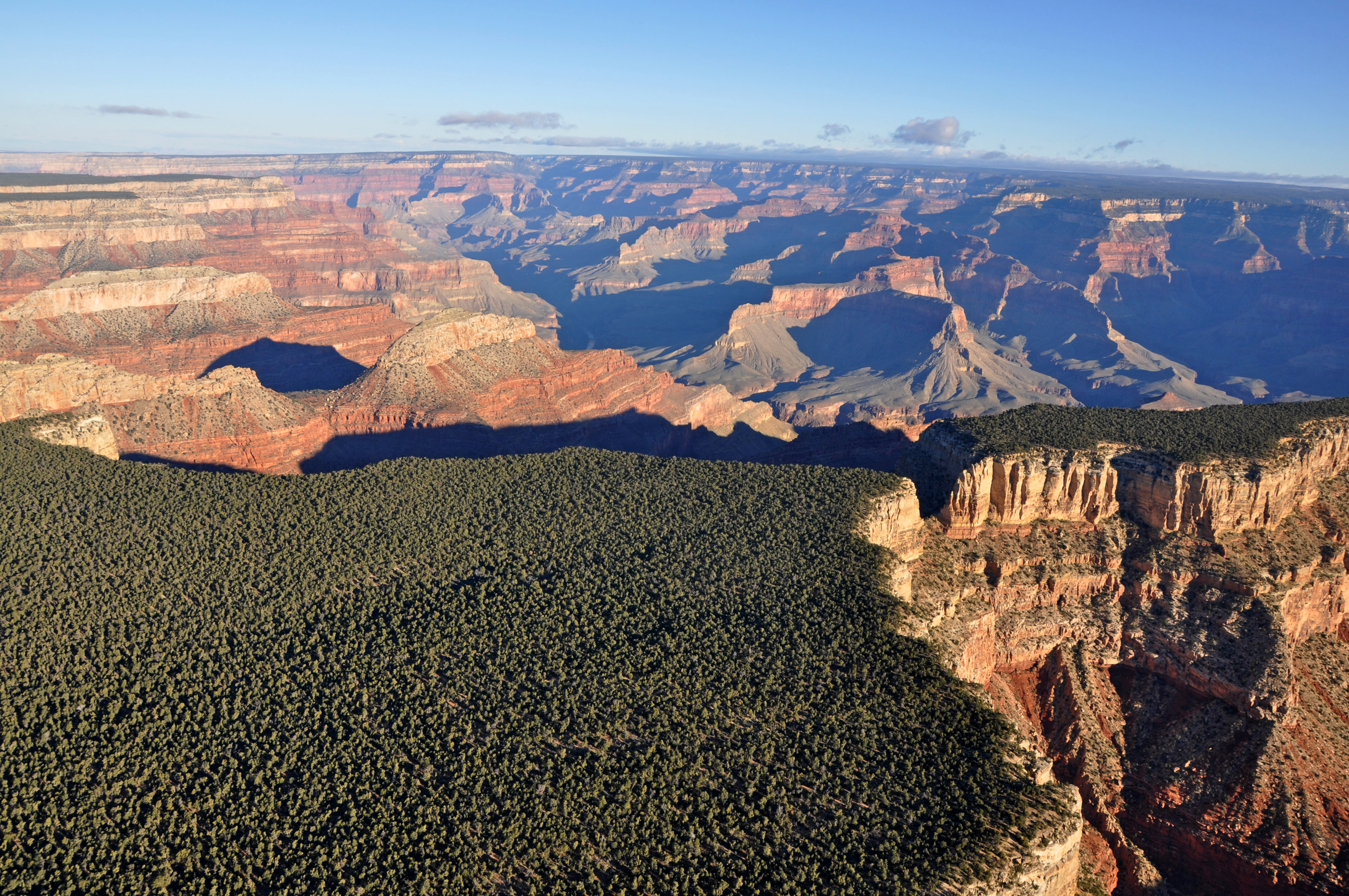
- South Rim with Mescalero Point, and the saddle to Diana Temple, linear, & forested landform

Highest point
- Elevation: 6,627 ft (2,020 m)
- Prominence: 190 ft (58 m)
- Parent peak: Yuma Point (6,654ft)
- Isolation: 3.6 mi (5.8 km)
- Coordinates: 36.1010931°N 112.2893409°W

Geography
- Location within Arizona Location within the United States
- Location: Grand Canyon National Park, Coconino County, Arizona, US
- Parent range: Kaibab Plateau; Coconino Plateau
- Topo map: USGS Piute Point

Geology
- Rock age: Permian down to Cambrian
- Mountain type(s): sedimentary rock: limestone-(prominence-cliff), mudstone, siltstone, sandstone
- Rock type(s): Kaibab Limestone-(prominence), Toroweap Formation, Coconino Sandstone, Hermit Shale, Supai Group, Redwall Limestone, Tonto Group

Mescalero Point is a 6,627 foot (2,020 m)-cliff-elevation point located in the central, (to beginning western), Grand Canyon, Coconino County of northern Arizona, United States. Mescalero Point is 3.6 miles from its closest highest scenic viewpoint, Yuma Point (6,654 ft), located east at Eremita Mesa, at the northeast, overlooking Central Hermit Canyon. (Hermit Canyon, with the Hermit Trail is located at the west terminus of West Rim Drive.)

Mescalero Point is in a region of points, at the headwaters of canyons, and landforms below the South Rim. Jicarilla Point lies ~1.0 mile west-northwest, and Mimbreno Point lies ~0.7 miles southeast.

Mescalero Point is distinctive because it has separated from the water divide between two canyons, by flat and forested, Diana Temple, which is narrow and linear, about a mile long. A saddle, about 0.1 mi long separates Mescalero Point from Diana Temple. Mescalero Point is at the headwaters of Slate Canyon, northwest, and Topaz Canyon, southeast.

== Geology ==
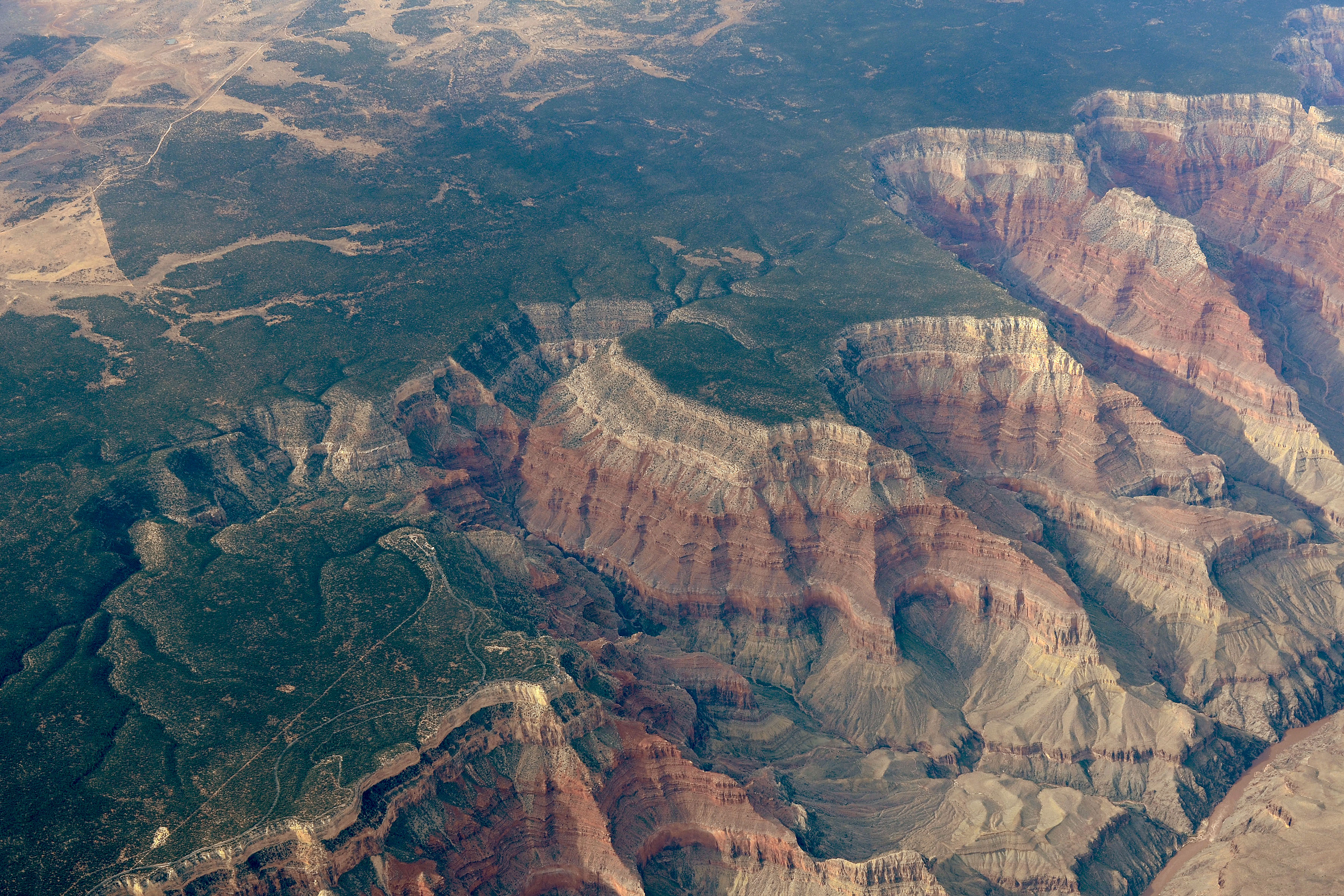
Mescalero Point-(top, far right) (Diana Temple not visible)

Mescalero Point is composed of horizontally-layered cliff-former Kaibab Limestone, and is mostly buff, or tan-white. The cliffs of Kaibab Limestone sit upon Toroweap Formation slopes, upon buff-white cliffs of Coconino Sandstone. Below are slopes of burnt-red Hermit Shale upon the red-orange Supai Group, which sit on upper platforms of the cliffs of Redwall Limestone. The Redwall sits on units of the Cambrian Tonto Group.

== See also ==
- Geology of the Grand Canyon area
- Cocopa Point
