= Vesta Temple =

Landform in the Grand Canyon, Arizona

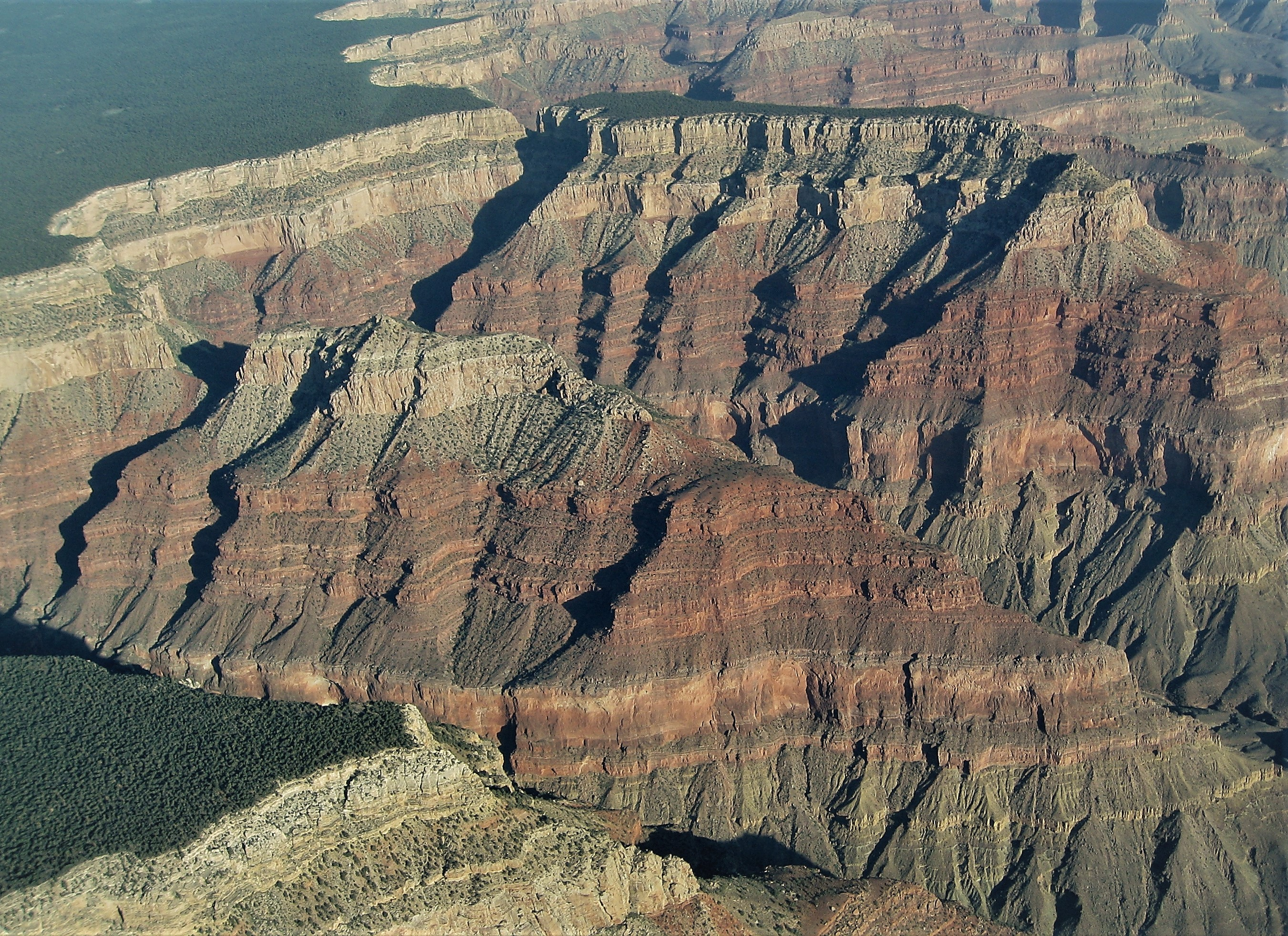
- Aerial view, Vesta Temple left, Diana (right)

Highest point
- Elevation: 6,299 ft (1,920 m)
- Prominence: 889 ft (271 m)
- Parent peak: Diana Temple (6,683 ft)
- Isolation: 1.27 mi (2.04 km)
- Coordinates: 36°05′37″N 112°16′08″W

Geography
- Location within Arizona Location within the United States
- Country: United States
- State: Arizona
- County: Coconino
- Protected area: Grand Canyon National Park
- Parent range: Coconino Plateau; Colorado Plateau
- Topo map: USGS Piute Point

Geology
- Rock type(s): limestone, sandstone, mudstone

Climbing
- First ascent: Alan Doty

Vesta Temple is a 6,299-foot-elevation (1,920-meter) summit located in the Grand Canyon, in Coconino County of northern Arizona, US. It is situated eight miles west-northwest of Grand Canyon Village, and immediately northeast of Mimbreno Point. Marsh Butte is one mile northeast, Eremita Mesa immediately southeast, and nearest higher neighbor Diana Temple is one mile north. Topographic relief is significant as Vesta Temple rises 3,900 feet (1,200 meters) above the Colorado River in 2.5 miles. Vesta Temple is named for Vesta, the goddess of the hearth, home, and family according to Roman mythology. Clarence Dutton began the practice of naming geographical features in the Grand Canyon after mythological deities. This geographical feature's toponym was officially adopted in 1908 by the U.S. Board on Geographic Names. According to the Köppen climate classification system, Vesta Temple is located in a Cold semi-arid climate zone.

== Geology ==
The summit of Vesta Temple is composed of Permian Kaibab Limestone and Toroweap Formation overlaying cream-colored, cliff-forming, Permian Coconino Sandstone. The sandstone, which is the third-youngest of the strata in the Grand Canyon, was deposited 265 million years ago as sand dunes. Below the Coconino Sandstone is reddish, slope-forming, Permian Hermit Formation, which in turn overlays the Pennsylvanian-Permian Supai Group. Further down are strata of the conspicuous cliff-forming Mississippian Redwall Limestone, the Cambrian Tonto Group, and finally granite of the Paleoproterozoic Vishnu Basement Rocks at river level in Granite Gorge. Precipitation runoff from Vesta Temple drains northeast to the Colorado River via Topaz Canyon and Boucher Creek.

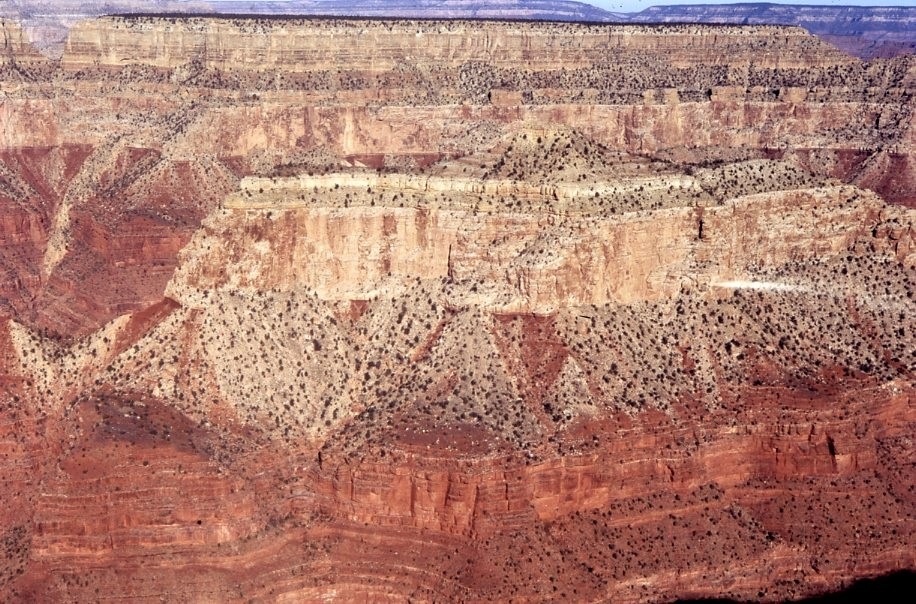
Vesta Temple in front of Diana Temple. Hermit Formation (red slope) below white cliff of Coconino Sandstone, Toroweap Formation (slope, white ledge, slope), and Kaibab Formation (top cliff of Vesta and Diana Temple).

== See also ==
- Geology of the Grand Canyon area
