= Pollux Temple =

Landform in the Grand Canyon, Arizona

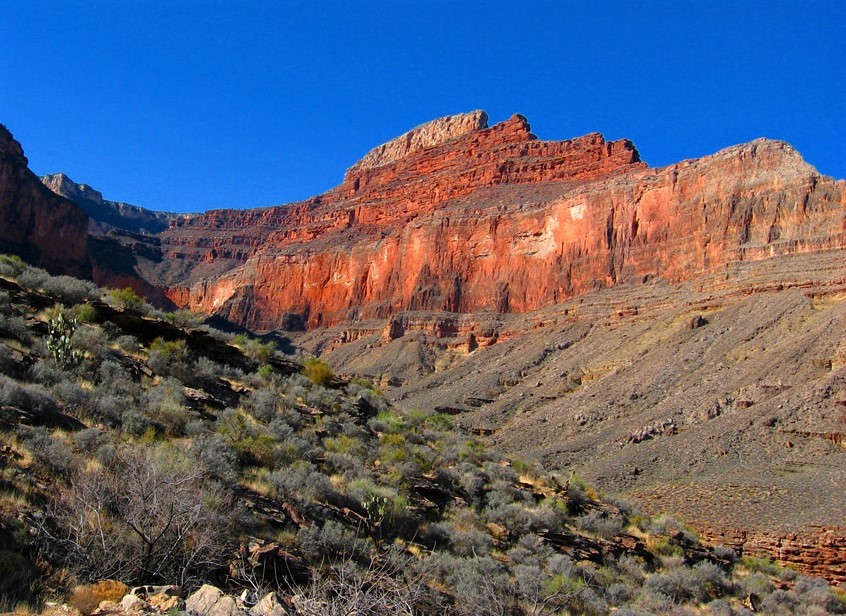
- Northeast aspect, from Tonto Trail

Highest point
- Elevation: 6,251 ft (1,905 m)
- Prominence: 762 ft (232 m)
- Parent peak: Diana Temple (6,683 ft)
- Isolation: 1.91 mi (3.07 km)
- Coordinates: 36°07′14″N 112°18′09″W

Geography
- Location within Arizona Location within the United States
- Country: United States
- State: Arizona
- County: Coconino
- Protected area: Grand Canyon National Park
- Parent range: Coconino Plateau; Colorado Plateau
- Topo map: USGS Piute Point

Geology
- Rock type(s): limestone, sandstone, mudstone

Climbing
- First ascent: March 1969 by Alan Doty
- Easiest route: class 4 climbing

Pollux Temple is a 6,251-foot-elevation (1,905-meter) summit in the Grand Canyon, in Coconino County of northern Arizona, US. It is situated ten miles northwest of Grand Canyon Village, and less than one mile northeast of Jicarilla Point. Castor Temple is one mile northwest, and Diana Temple is one mile southeast. Topographic relief is significant as Pollux Temple rises nearly 4,000 feet (1,200 meters) above the Colorado River in less than two miles. Pollux Temple is named for Pollux, the divine son of Zeus according to Greek mythology. Clarence Dutton began the practice of naming geographical features in the Grand Canyon after mythological deities. According to the Köppen climate classification system, Pollux Temple is located in a Cold semi-arid climate zone.

== Geology ==
The top of Pollux Temple is composed of Permian Toroweap Formation overlaying cream-colored, cliff-forming, Permian Coconino Sandstone. The sandstone, which is the third-youngest of the strata in the Grand Canyon, was deposited 265 million years ago as sand dunes. Below the Coconino Sandstone is reddish, slope-forming, Permian Hermit Formation, which in turn overlays the Pennsylvanian-Permian Supai Group. Further down are strata of the conspicuous cliff-forming Mississippian Redwall Limestone, the Cambrian Tonto Group, and finally granite of the Paleoproterozoic Vishnu Basement Rocks at river level in Granite Gorge. Precipitation runoff from Pollux Temple drains north to the Colorado River via Agate and Sapphire Canyons.

== Gallery ==
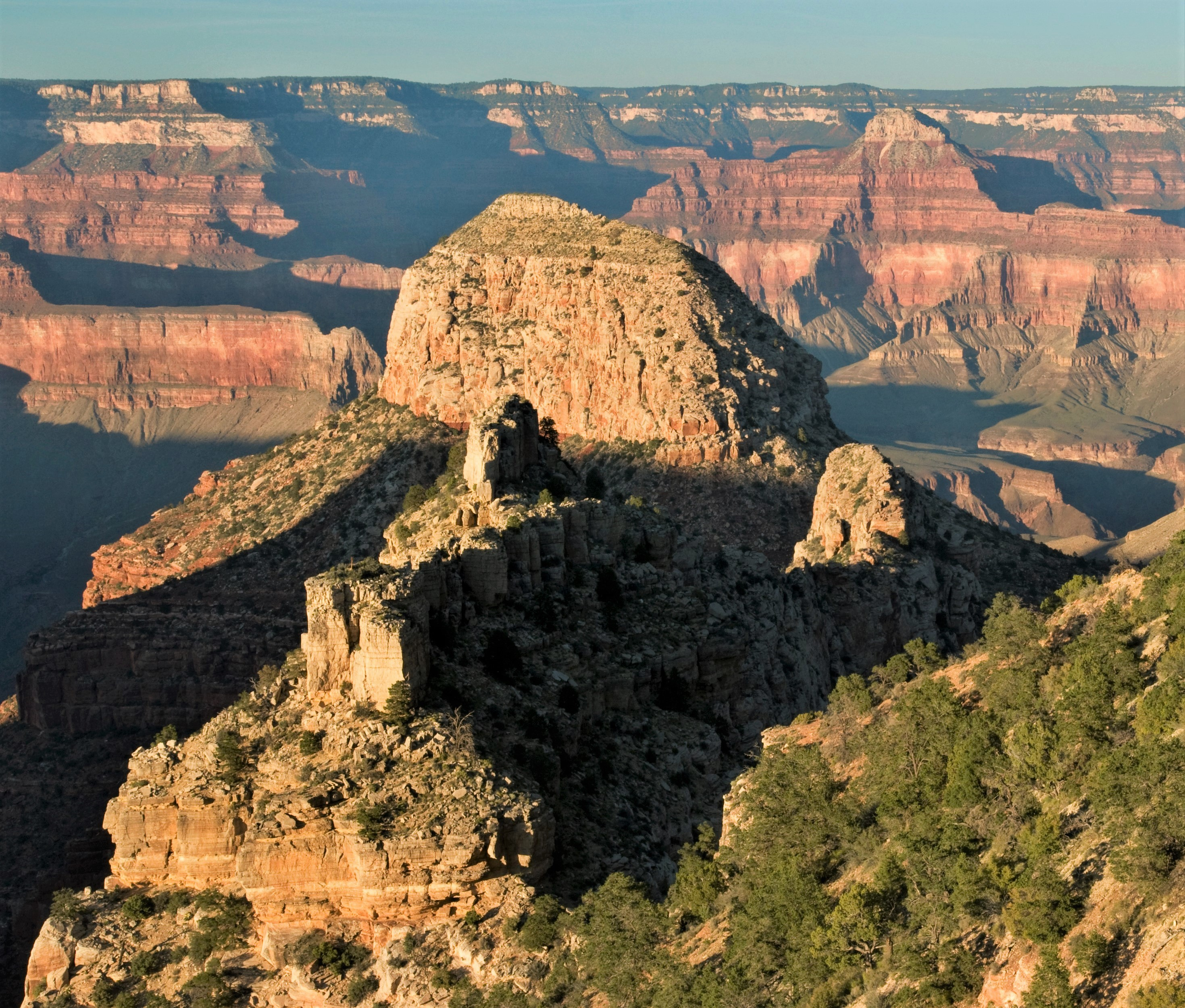
Pollux Temple from Jicarilla Point. (Mencius Temple in upper right)

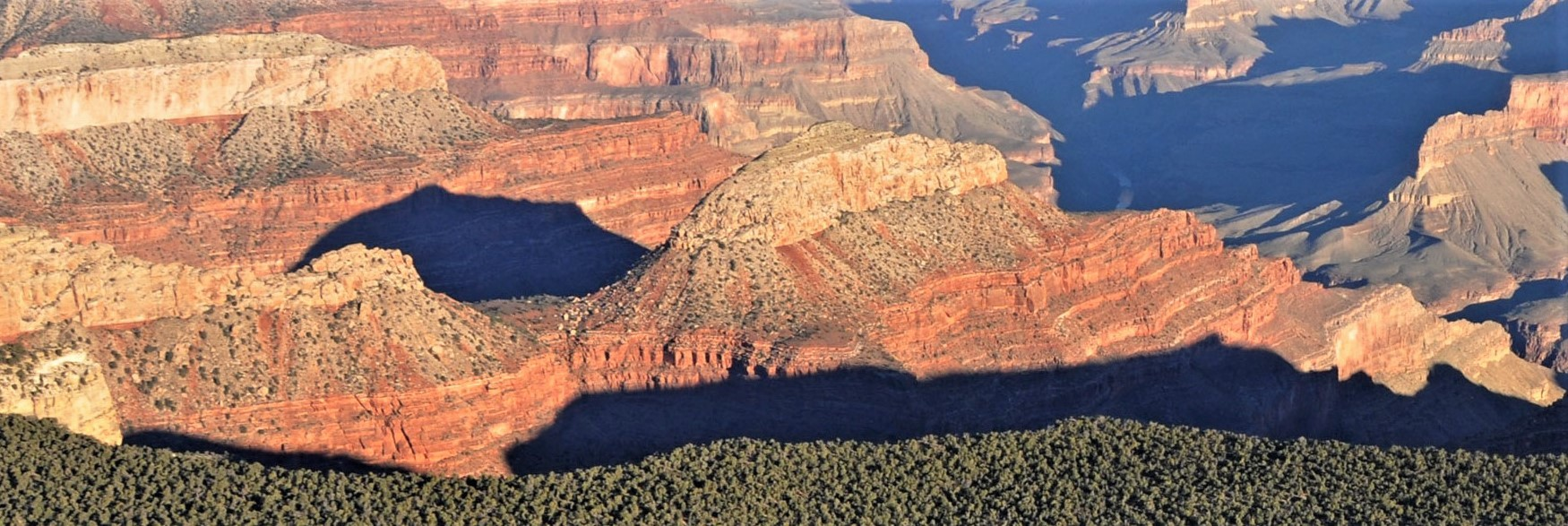
Aerial of Pollux Temple centered, casting shadow onto Castor Temple (upper left)

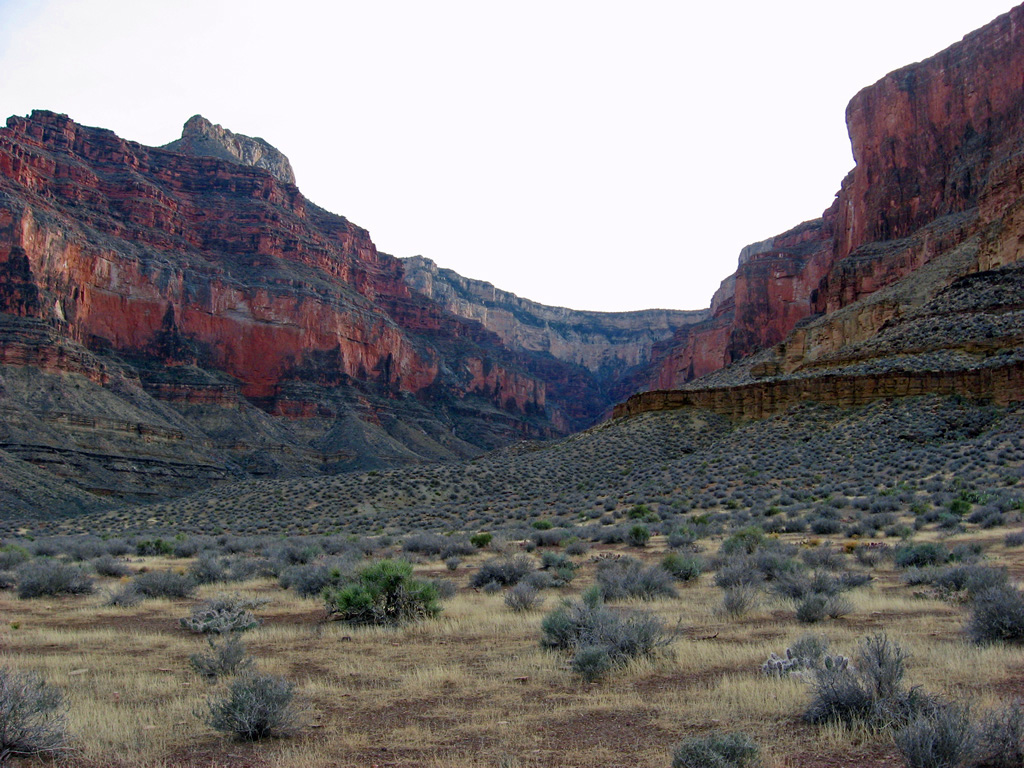
Pollux Temple (upper left), with Sapphire Canyon, from Tonto Trail

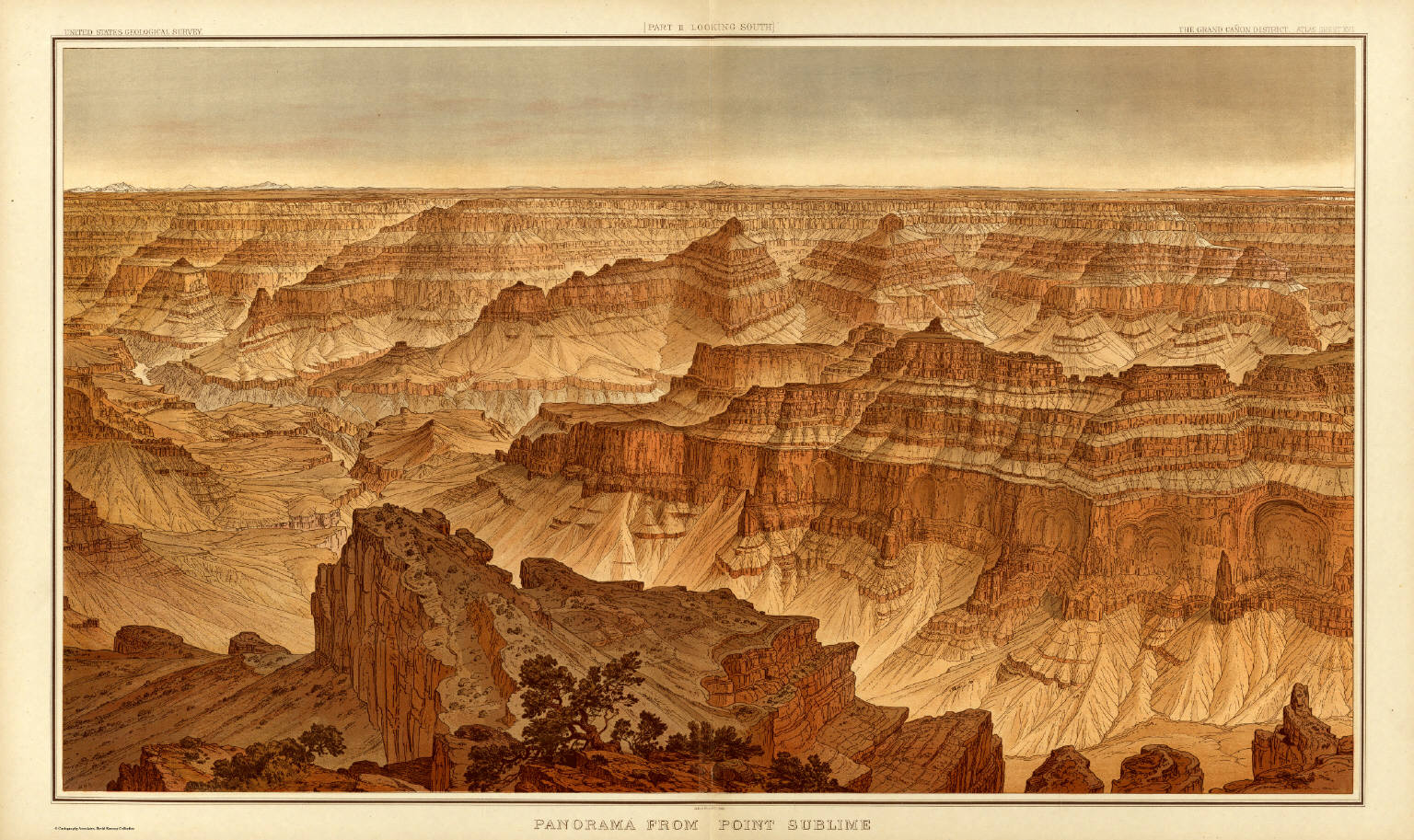
Pollux Temple centered in distance, from Point Sublime.
Artwork by William Henry Holmes.

== See also ==
- Geology of the Grand Canyon area
- Scorpion Ridge
