= Marsh Butte =

Landform in the Grand Canyon, Arizona

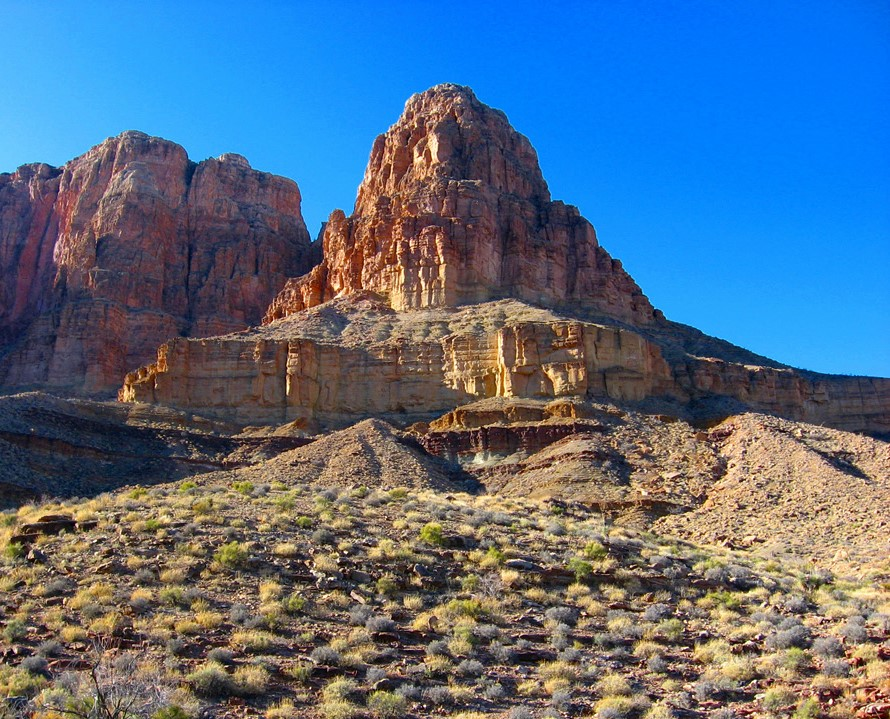
- East aspect, from Tonto Trail

Highest point
- Elevation: 4,721 ft (1,439 m)
- Prominence: 301 ft (92 m)
- Parent peak: Diana Temple (6,683 ft)
- Isolation: 1.51 mi (2.43 km)
- Coordinates: 36°07′15″N 112°14′43″W

Naming
- Etymology: Othniel Charles Marsh

Geography
- Location within Arizona Location within the United States
- Country: United States
- State: Arizona
- County: Coconino
- Protected area: Grand Canyon National Park
- Parent range: Coconino Plateau; Colorado Plateau
- Topo map: USGS Grand Canyon

Geology
- Rock type(s): limestone, shale, sandstone

Climbing
- First ascent: 1977
- Easiest route: class 4 climbing

Marsh Butte is a 4,721-foot-elevation (1,439-meter) summit located in the Grand Canyon, in Coconino County in the northern part of the U.S. state of Arizona. It is situated eight miles northwest of Grand Canyon Village, immediately east-northeast of Diana Temple, and Tower of Ra stands directly opposite across Granite Gorge. Topographic relief is significant, as Marsh Butte rises over 2,300 feet (700 meters) above the Colorado River in half a mile (1 km).

Marsh Butte is composed of Mississippian Redwall Limestone, overlaying the Cambrian Tonto Group, and finally granite of the Paleoproterozoic Vishnu Basement Rocks at river level in Granite Gorge. According to the Köppen climate classification system, Marsh Butte is located in a cold semi-arid climate zone.

== History ==
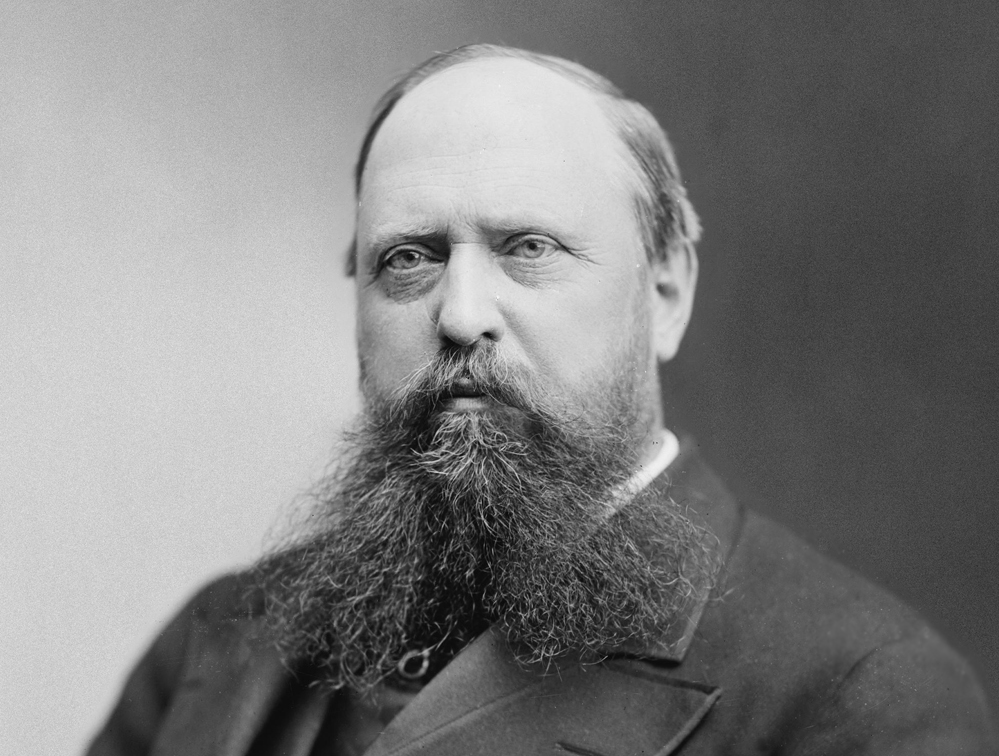
Marsh

In March 1906, this butte was officially named "Endymion Dome", for Endymion of Greek mythology, in keeping with Clarence Dutton's practice of naming geographical features in the Grand Canyon after mythological deities. However, George Wharton James suggested it should be named after preeminent paleontologist Othniel Charles Marsh (1831–1899), and two months later it was officially renamed in May 1906 by the U.S. Board on Geographic Names. George Wharton James described it in his 1910 book "The Grand Canyon of Arizona How to See It" as "a butte of singularly beautiful structure."

The first ascent of the summit was made October 29, 1977, by Pete Baertlein and Mitch McCombs via the class 4 east ridge.

== See also ==
- Geology of the Grand Canyon area

== Gallery ==
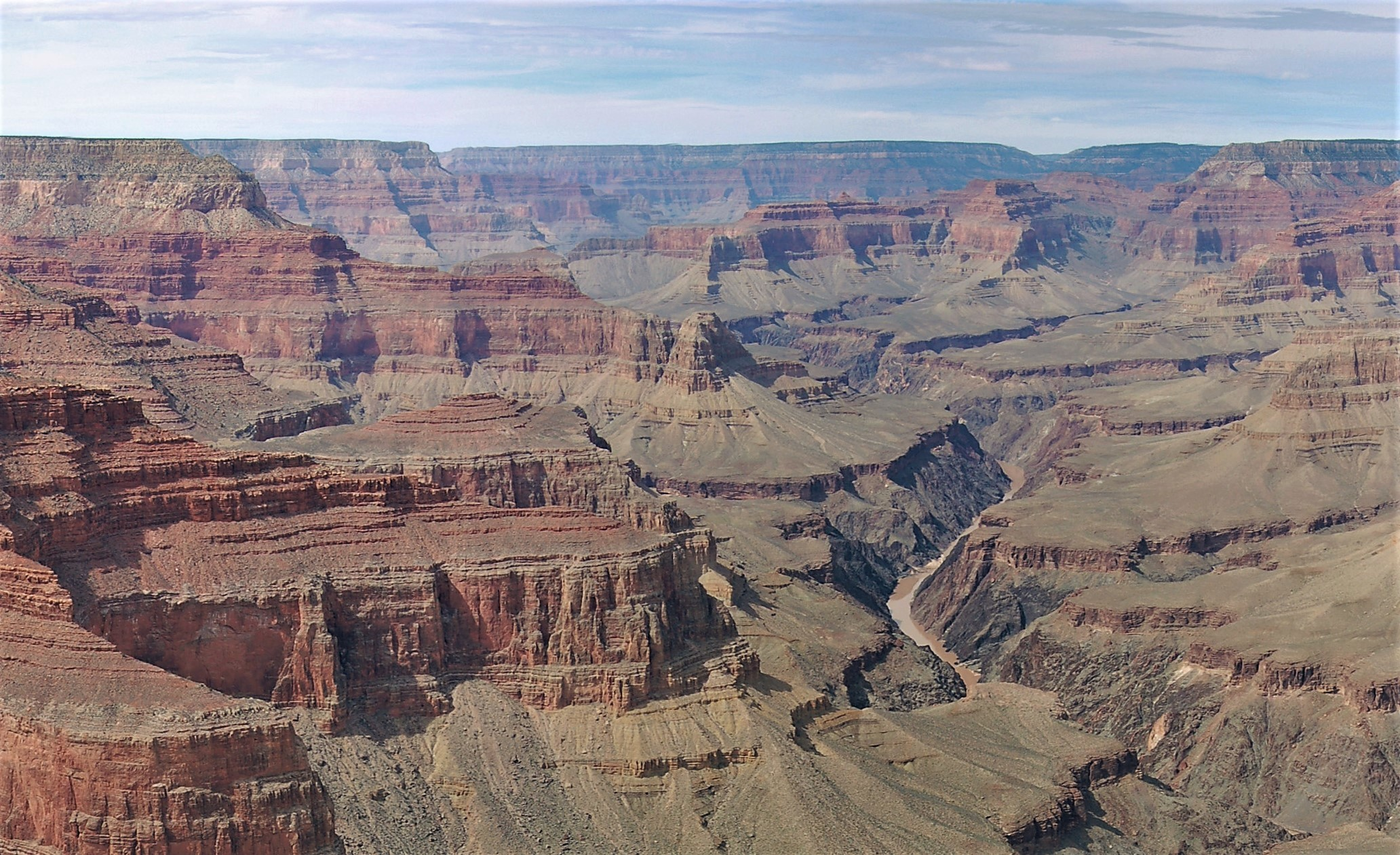
Marsh Butte (centered in bullseye), from Pima Point

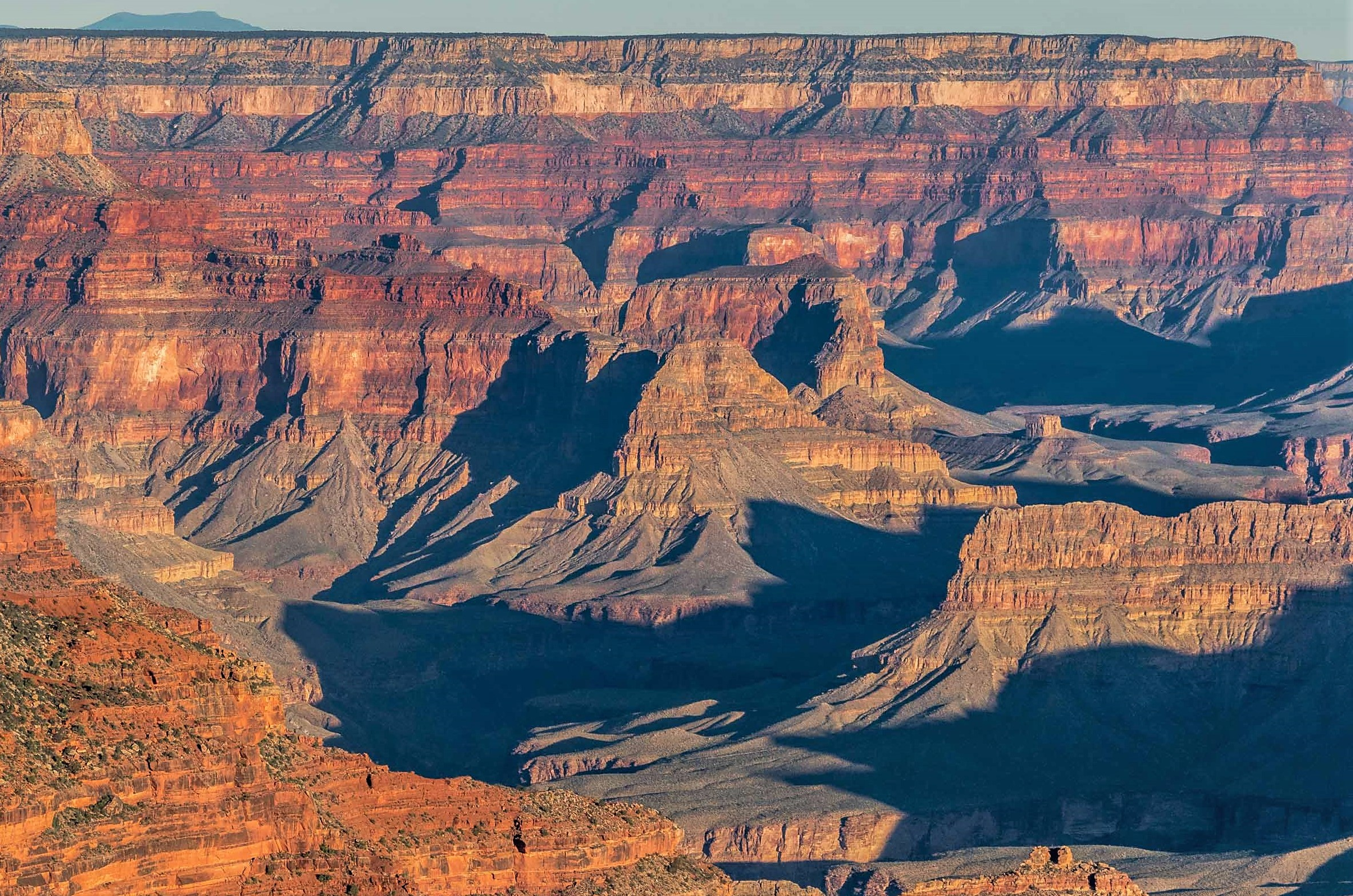
Marsh Butte centered in bullseye, Geikie Peak behind it

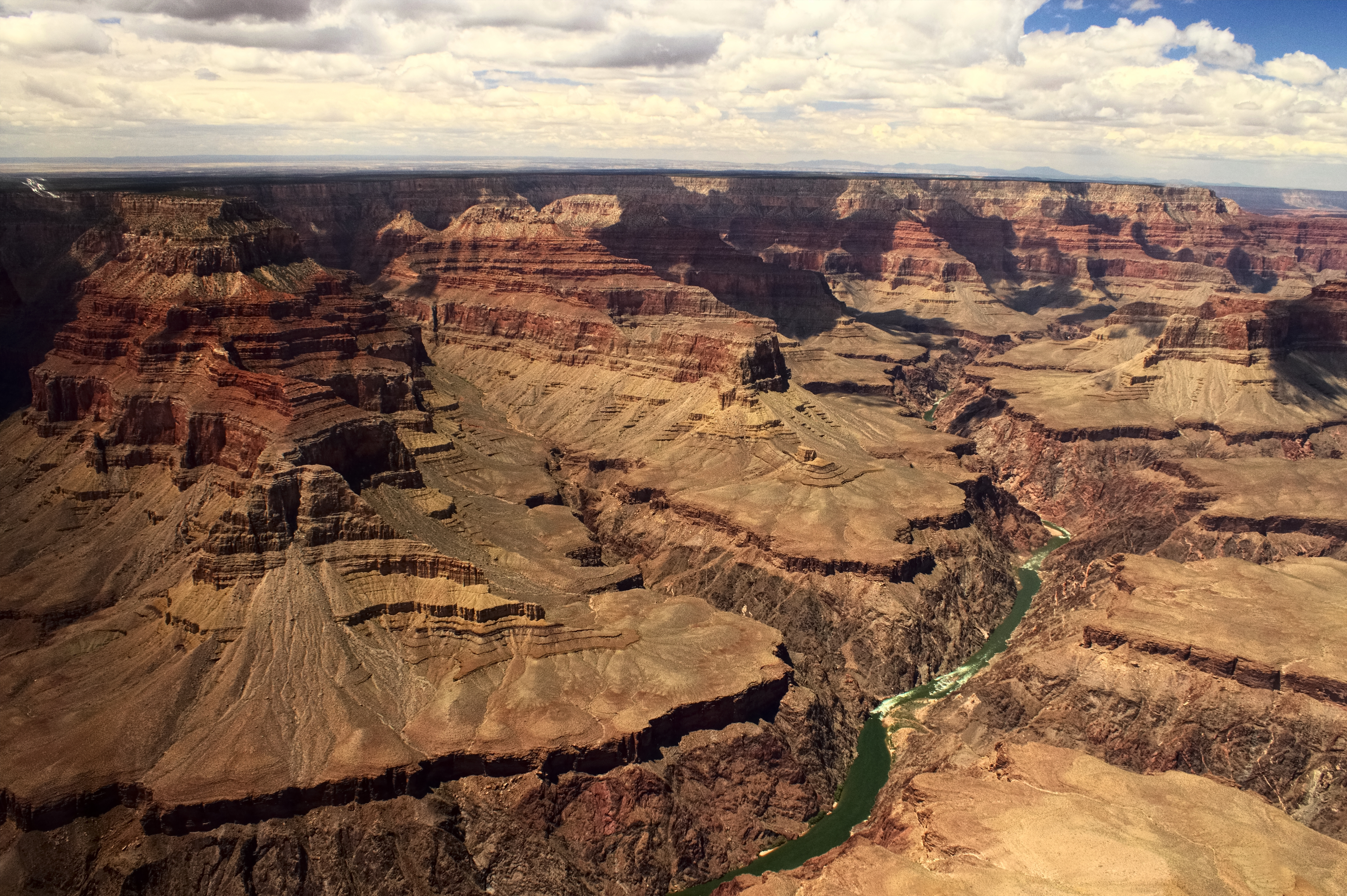
Aerial view with Marsh Butte lower left, Diana Temple upper left, Geikie Peak centered at bullseye.

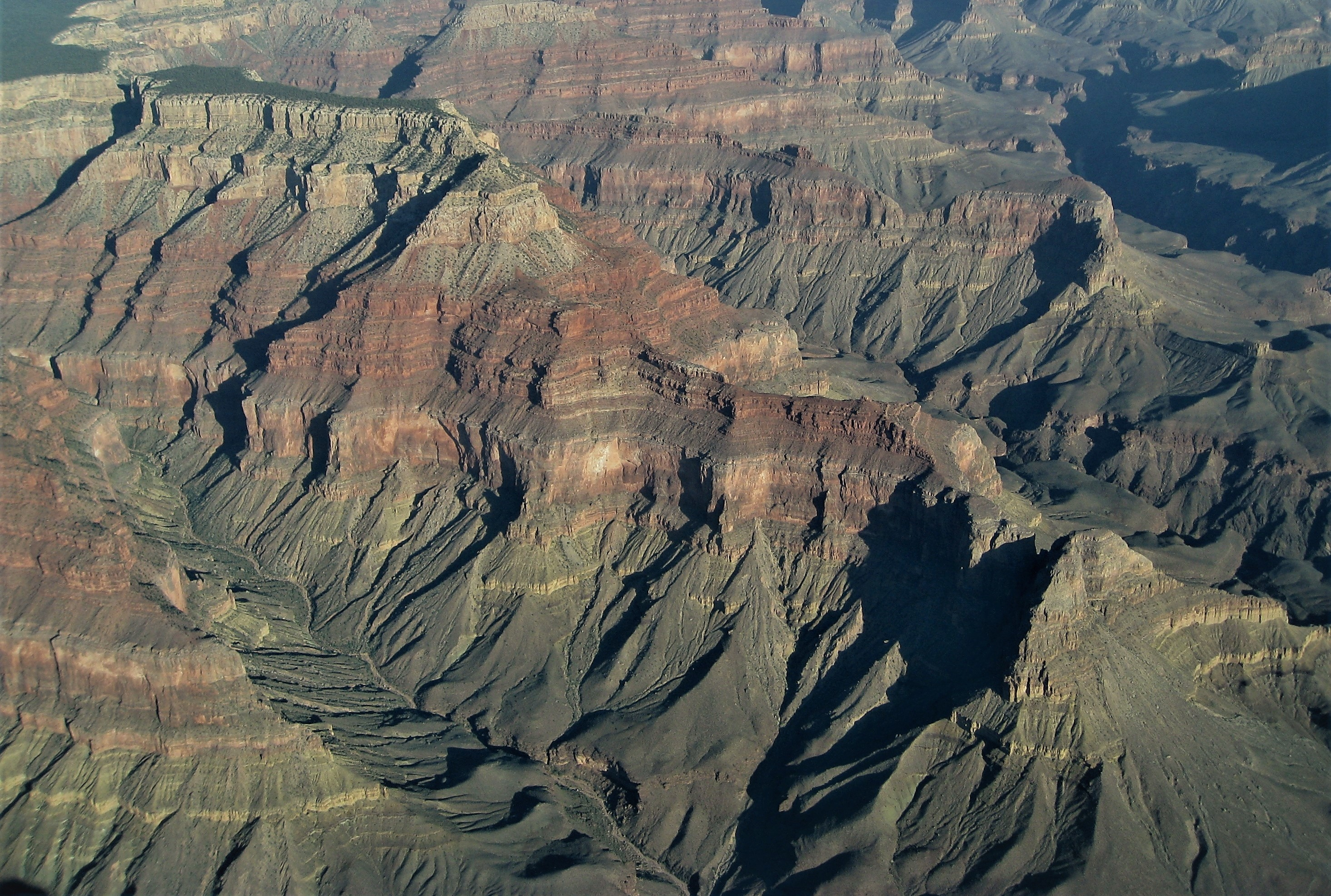
Aerial view of Diana Temple (upper left) and Marsh Butte (lower right)

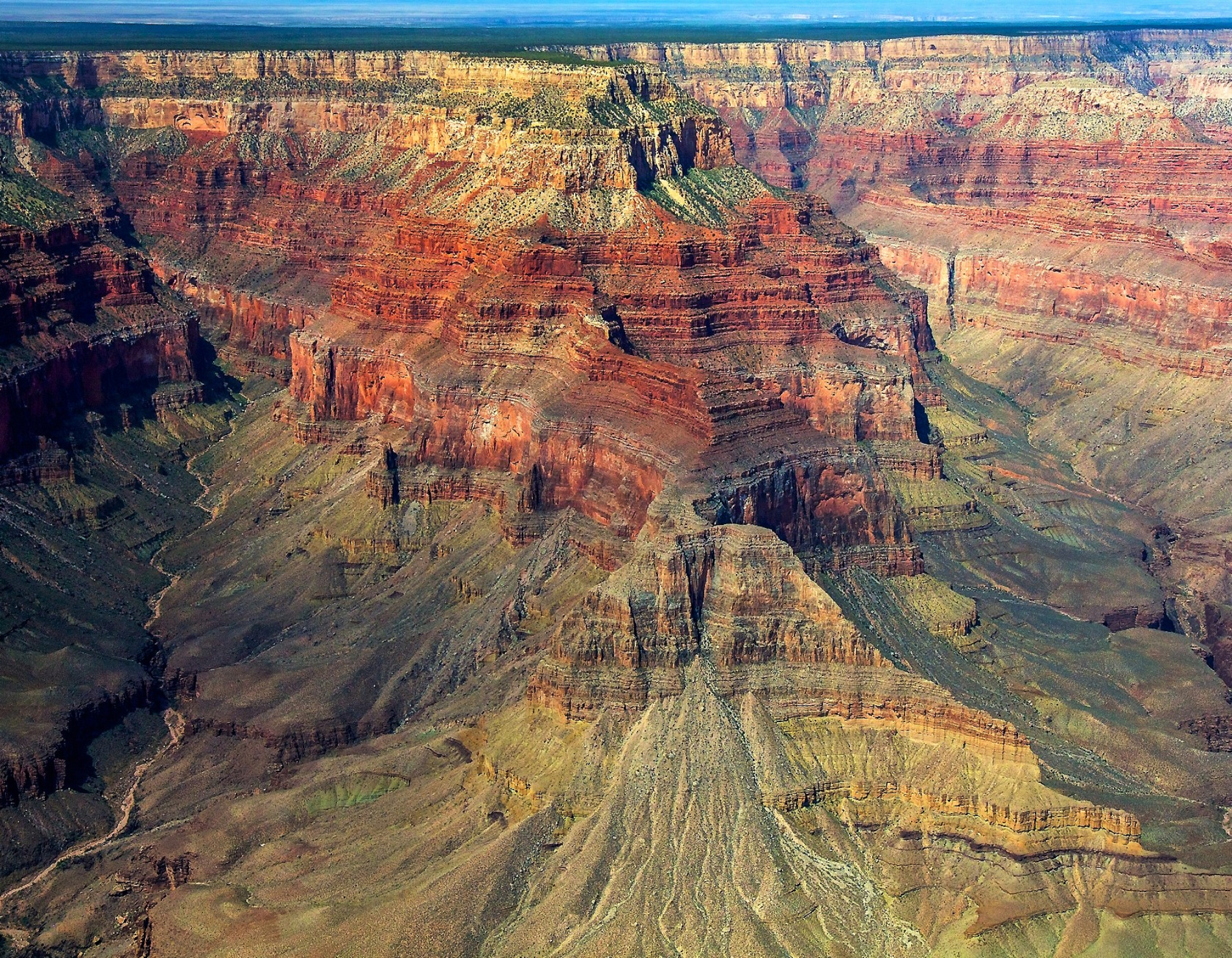
Diana Temple centered at top and Marsh Butte centered at bottom.
Aerial view from ENE.

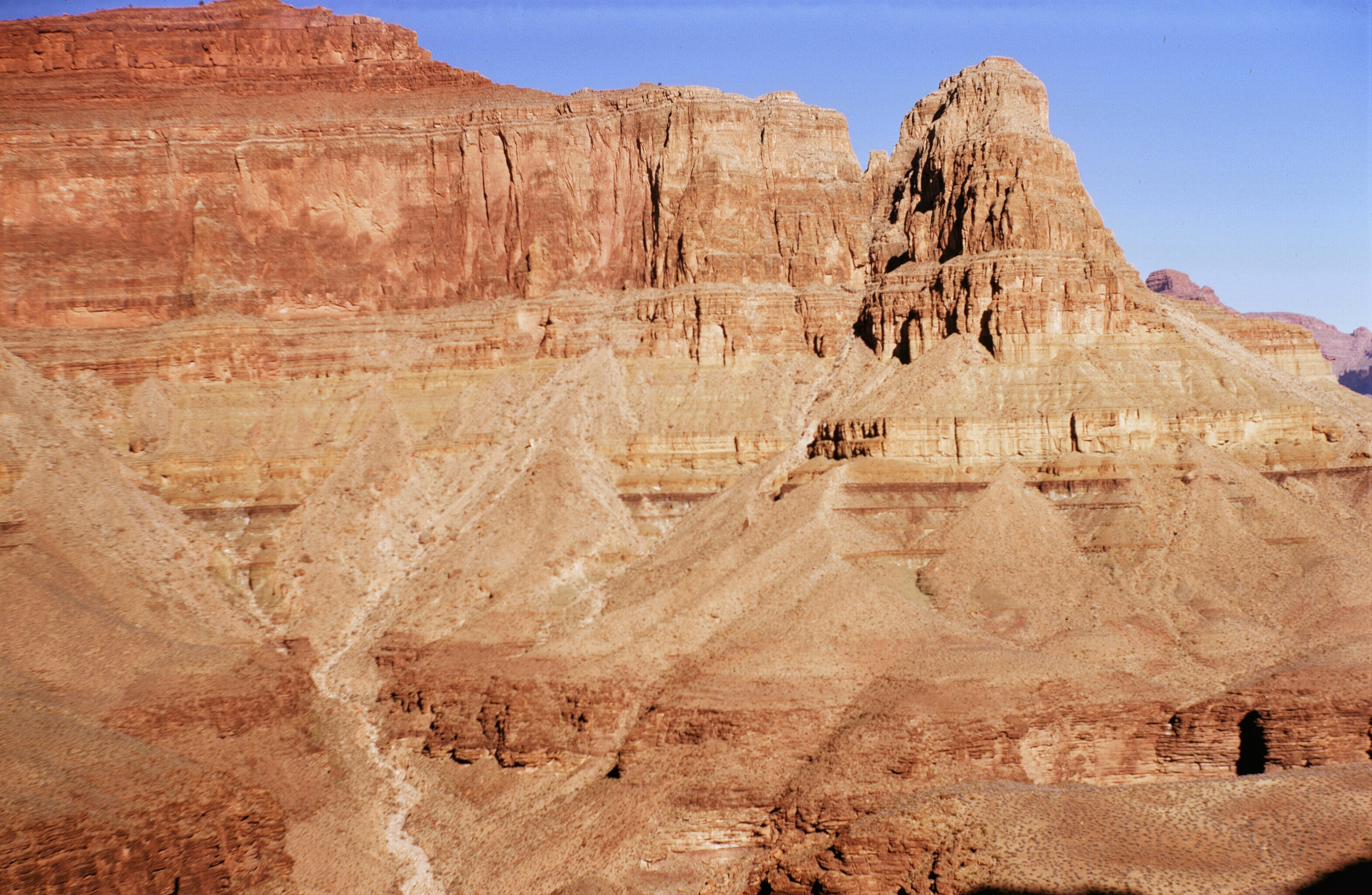
Marsh Butte (end of ridge) formed in Redwall Limestone. Tapeats Sandstone (brown cliff at bottom of photograph), Manakacha Formation (red cliff at top of photograph).
