= Geikie Peak =

Landform in the Grand Canyon, Arizona

- Geike Monument
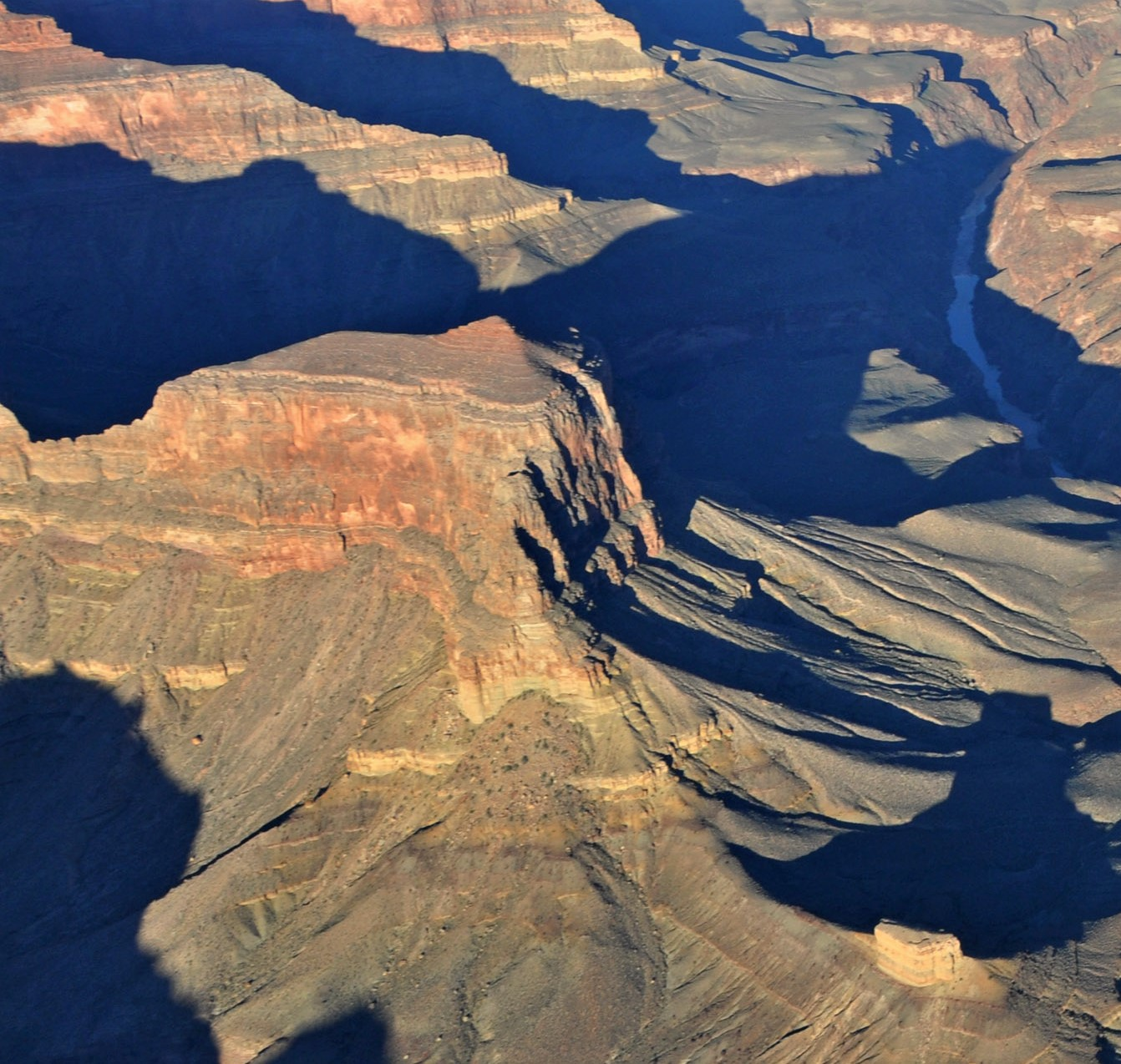
- Aerial view of Geikie's east-southeast aspect. (Scylla Butte lower right corner)

Highest point
- Elevation: 5,005 ft (1,526 m)
- Prominence: 625 ft (191 m)
- Parent peak: Peak 5180
- Isolation: 1.22 mi (1.96 km)
- Coordinates: 36°08′00″N 112°16′09″W

Naming
- Etymology: Archibald Geikie

Geography
- Location within Arizona Location within the United States
- Country: United States
- State: Arizona
- County: Coconino
- Protected area: Grand Canyon National Park
- Parent range: Coconino Plateau; Colorado Plateau
- Topo map: USGS Havasupai Point

Geology
- Rock type(s): limestone, shale, sandstone

Climbing
- Easiest route: class 5.4 climbing

Geikie Peak is a 5,005-foot (1,526 m)-elevation summit located in the Grand Canyon, in Coconino County of northern Arizona, United States. It is situated nine miles (14 km) northwest of Grand Canyon Village, immediately north of Diana Temple, and south of Scorpion Ridge which lies across the opposite side of Granite Gorge. Access is via the Tonto Trail which traverses 270 degrees around the base of the peak. Topographic relief is significant as Geikie Peak rises over 2,600 feet (790 m) above the Colorado River in one-half mile (0.80 km). According to the Köppen climate classification system, Geikie Peak is located in a cold semi-arid climate zone.

== History ==
George Wharton James named it "Geikie Monument" in 1901 for Sir Archibald Geikie (1835–1924), Director General of the Geological Survey of the United Kingdom, who studied geology in the Grand Canyon, finding evidence to support his theories of erosion. This feature's present name was officially adopted in 1908 by the U.S. Board on Geographic Names.

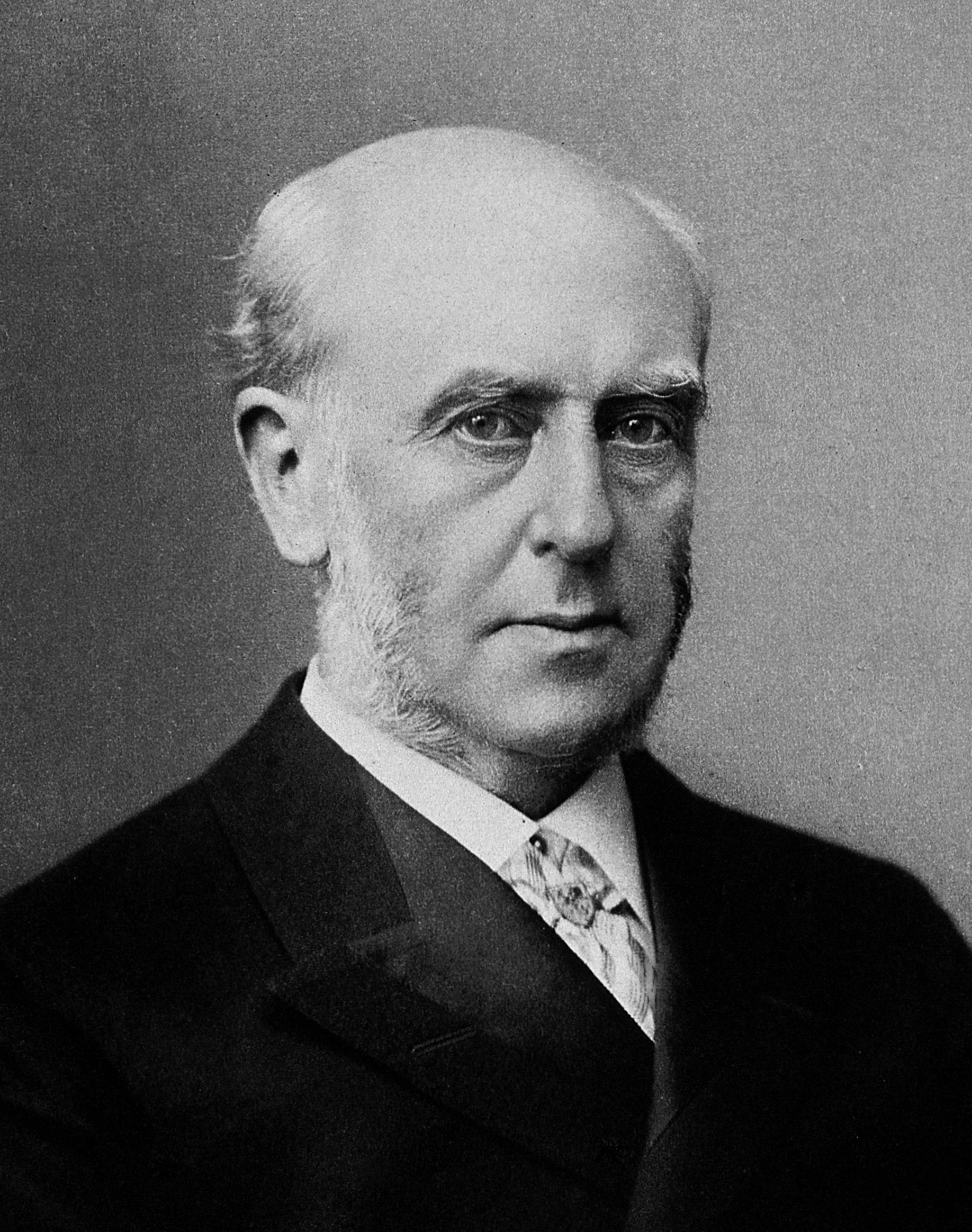
Sir Archibald Geikie

== Geology ==
Geikie Peak is composed of Mississippian Redwall Limestone, with a small cupola of the basal layer of Pennsylvanian-Permian Supai Group on top. The cliff-forming Redwall overlays the Cambrian Tonto Group, and below that Paleoproterozoic Vishnu Basement Rocks at river level in Granite Gorge.

== Scylla Butte ==
At the end of Geikie Peak's east spur lies a smaller feature called Scylla Butte. This feature is named for Scylla, a monster according to Greek mythology, in keeping with Clarence Dutton's practice of naming geographical features in the Grand Canyon after mythological deities. It rises approximately 400 feet above the Tonto Trail which nearly surrounds it. The first ascent of this butte was made by James Kirshvink and James Ohlman on March 18, 1978.

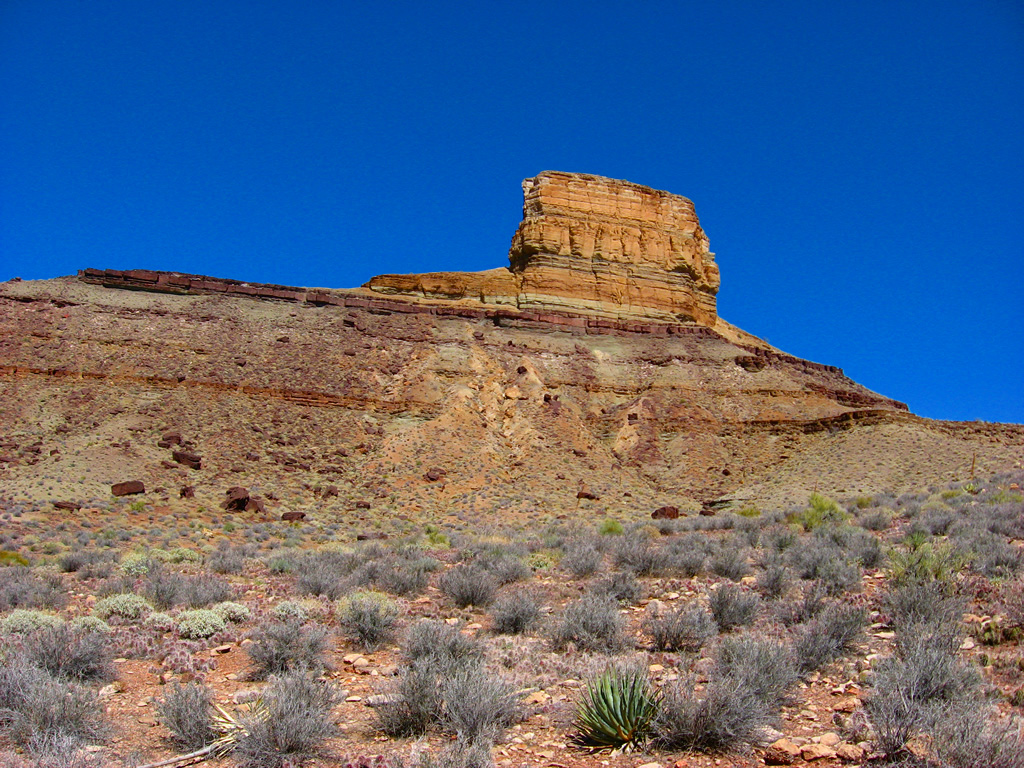
Scylla Butte, south aspect

== See also ==
- Geology of the Grand Canyon area
