= Scorpion Ridge =

Landform in the Grand Canyon, Arizona

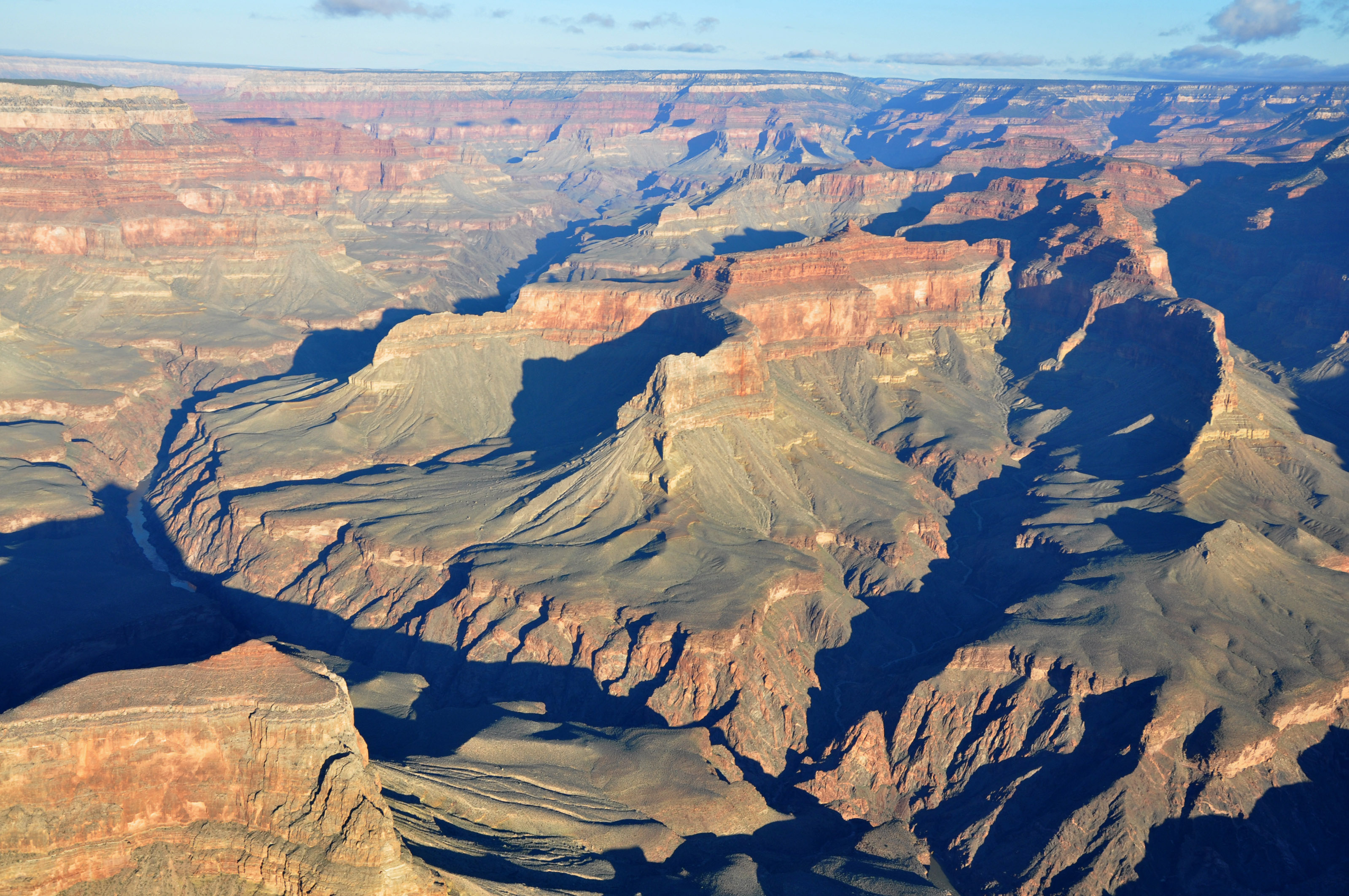
- Scorpion Ridge (peak: on platform-ridge of red cliff-former Manakacha Formation, the small remainder cliff of Esplanade Sandstone)

Highest point
- Elevation: 5,832 ft (1,778 m)
- Prominence: 652 ft (199 m)
- Parent peak: 6,181 ft (1,884 m)
- Coordinates: 36.1729°N 112.2792°W

Geography
- Location within Arizona
- Location: Grand Canyon; Coconino County, Arizona. U.S.
- Topo map: USPS Havasupai Point

Geology
- Rock age(s): Pennsylvanian down to Cambrian and Proterozoic
- Mountain type: Sedimentary rock
- Rock types: Esplanade Sandstone-(prominence) and Supai Group (4-units); Wescogame, Manakacha, Watahomigi units (massif)-Redwall Limestone; Tonto Group _3-Muav Limestone _2-Bright Angel Shale _1-Tapeats Sandstone; Vishnu Basement Rocks

Scorpion Ridge is a 5,832-foot (1,778 m) prominence, and a ridgeline-landform shaped like a scorpion, composed of the colorful red-orange Supai Group rocks, a linear ridge with two south-projecting arms of ridgeline that trend south to the Colorado River. Scorpion Ridge is approximately 11 miles (18 km) northwest of Grand Canyon Village near the beginning of West Grand Canyon. The Scorpion Ridge-Sagittarius Ridge north–south ridges are adjacent west to the North Rim ridgeline that extends south to Imperial Point, overlooking the beginning of West Grand Canyon. The position of Scorpion Ridge causes the Colorado River to flow west, then northwest, then north. Surrounding the two ridgelines to the Colorado, the river has the Serpentine Rapids west, the Sapphire Rapids (the drainage between the two scorpion-arms), and the Willie Necktie Rapids, just downstream from Tuna Creek confluence, and Canyon, the major drainage at the east of the Imperial Point ridge.

The Scorpion Ridge (body and arms) trend north-northeast for 2.5 miles (4.0 km); both arms are roughly 1.0 mile (1.6 km) long, with the trendline, and curved inward like enclosing arms. The high point of Scorpion Ridge (5,832 ft) is near the center of the north trend (composed of a remainder cliff-spire of Esplanade Sandstone on Wescogame Formation on platform-ridgeline of Manakacha Formation); the east arm height ends at 4,961 feet (1,512 m); the west arm ends at 4,594 feet (1,400 m). On the Colorado, Scorpion Ridge is opposite Geikie Peak, Pollux Temple, Serpentine Canyon outfall, west, and Sapphire Canyon outfall, east.

== Geology ==
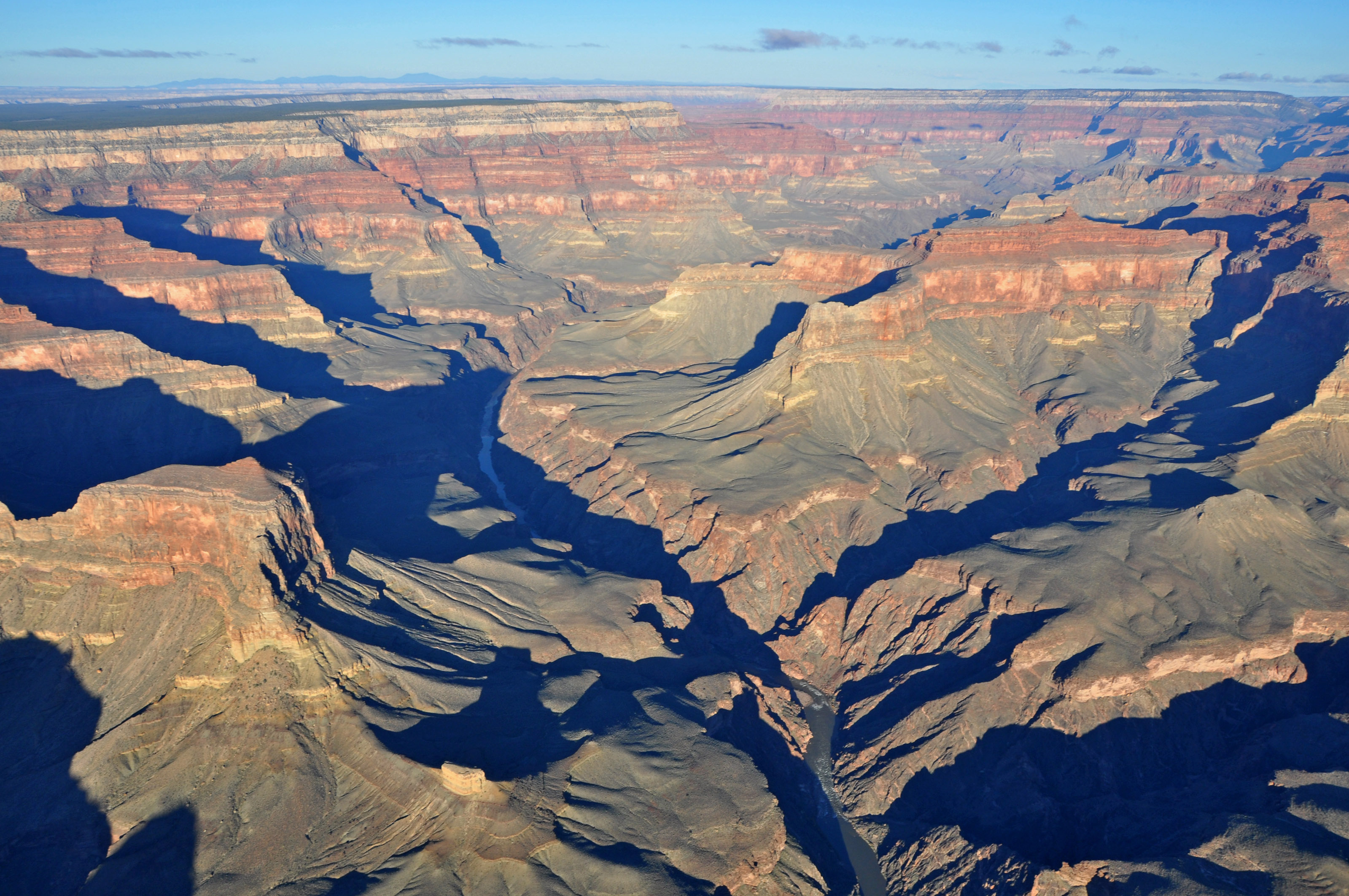
Aerial overview, westward

Scorpion Ridge has the common sequence of rock layers of the Grand Canyon. Because of the landform's shape and position, broad colorful dull-greenish slope-forming slopes of Bright Angel Shale surround the landform, ending at short platform cliffs of Tapeats Sandstone, upon Granite Gorge and the Vishnu Basement Rocks.

=== Scorpion Ridge prominence ===
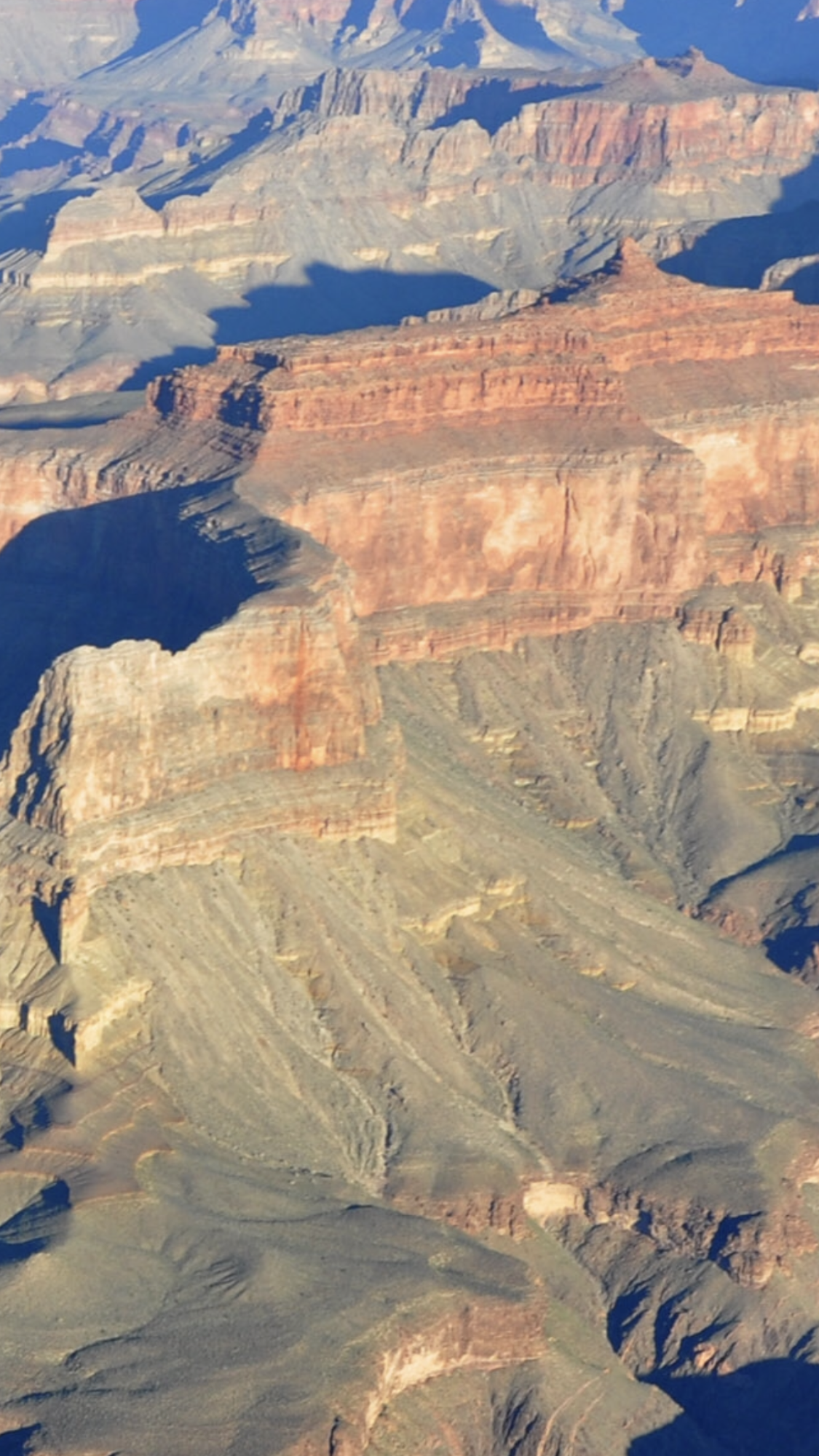
Mostly flat Scorpion Ridge of Manakacha Formation; caprock spire of Esplanade Sandstone

The extended ridgelines of Scorpion Ridge are mostly unit 2 of the Supai Group, protecting the slopes underneath of the unit 1, the Watahomigi Formation. Unit 2, the Manakacha Formation is a cliff-former, but also an erosion-resistant platform-former. The most common, and famous platform-former in the Grand Canyon, is the top of the Redwall Limestone cliffs, which supports many prominences in the Grand Canyon.

The prominence on Scorpion Ridge is a caprock of the Supai unit 4, Permian, Esplanade Sandstone, protecting the unit 3, erosive slope-former below. The Esplanade (Grand Canyon) is found on the South Rim side of Western Grand Canyon, because the Esplanade Sandstone thickens westward, from Central and East Grand Canyon.
