= Cocopa Point =

Landform in the Grand Canyon, Arizona

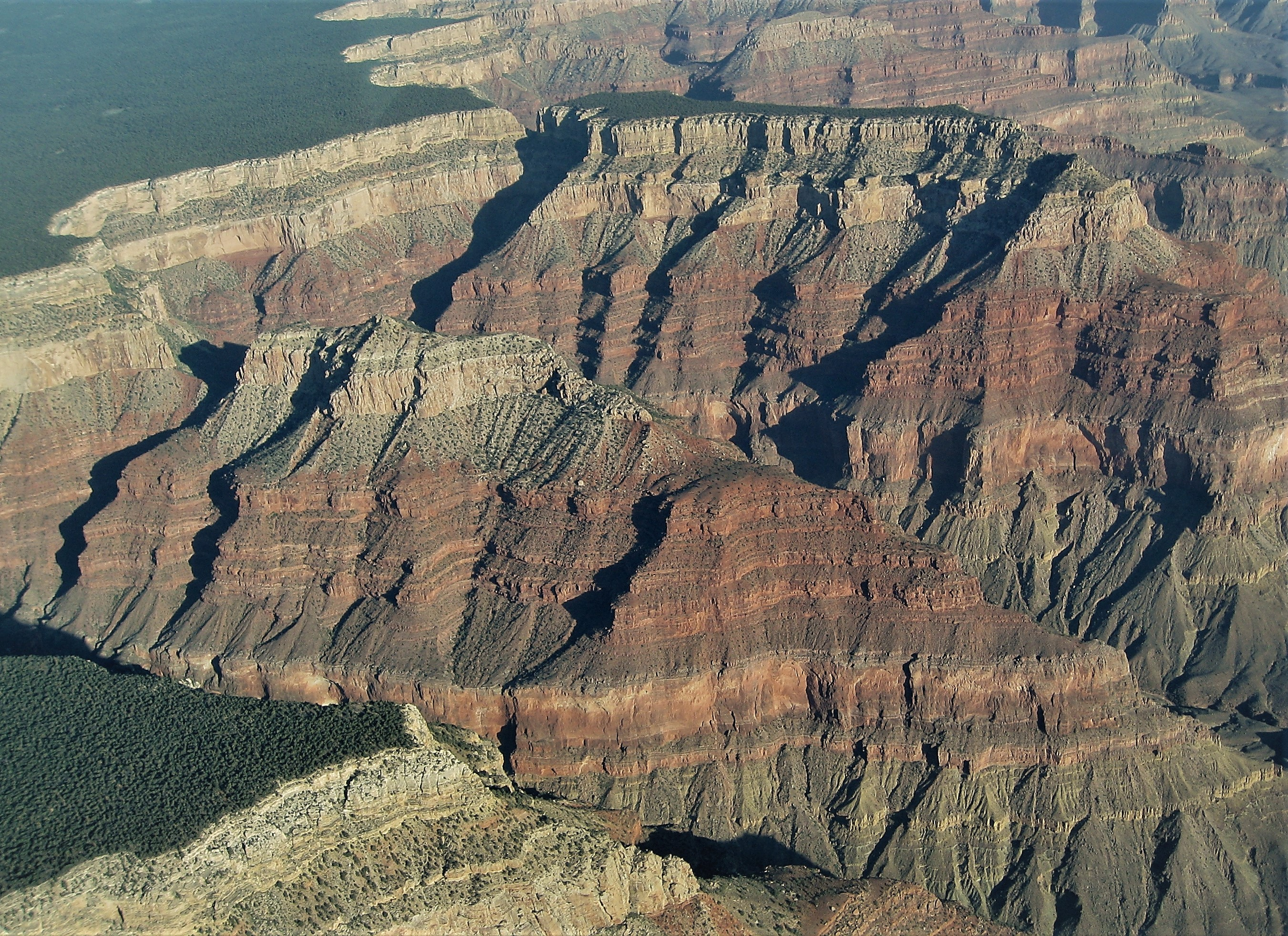
- Cocopa Point, bottom-left

Highest point
- Elevation: 6,627 ft (2,020 m)
- Prominence: 92 ft (28 m)
- Parent peak: Yuma Point (6,654ft)
- Isolation: 1.1 mi (1.8 km)
- Coordinates: 36.0880377°N 112.2460061°W

Geography
- Location within Arizona Location within the United States
- Location: Grand Canyon National Park, Coconino County, Arizona, US
- Parent range: Kaibab Plateau; Coconino Plateau
- Topo map: USGS Grand Canyon

Geology
- Rock age: Permian down to Cambrian
- Mountain type(s): sedimentary rock: limestone-(prominence-cliff), mudstone, siltstone, shale, sandstone
- Rock type(s): Kaibab Limestone-(prominence), Toroweap Formation, Coconino Sandstone, Hermit Shale, Supai Group, Redwall Limestone, Tonto Group

Cocopa Point is a 6,627 foot (2,020 m)-cliff-elevation Point located in the central, (to beginning Western), Grand Canyon, Coconino County of northern Arizona, United States. Cocopa Point is 1.1 miles from its closest highest scenic viewpoint, Yuma Point (6,654 ft), located east at Eremita Mesa (Spanish for Hermit Mesa), at the northeast, overlooking Central Hermit Canyon. (Hermit Canyon, with the Hermit Trail is located at the west terminus of West Rim Drive.)

Cocopa Point is in a region of points, at the headwaters of canyons, and landforms below the South Rim. Mimbreno Point lies ~1.7 miles west, and Hermit Canyon and Pima Point, at the west-terminus of West Rim Drive, are about 1.5 mi and 2.0 miles due-east. Cocopa Point is at the northwest of Eremita Mesa; Yuma Point is at the northeast; the mesa lies between Hermit Canyon, east, and Upper Boucher Canyon, west. Cocopa Point is a sheer-walled cliff, sitting at the northwest headwaters of short, Travertine Canyon. At the west of Lower Travertine Canyon, adjacent the Colorado River (south, at Granite Gorge), sits Whites Butte, about 1.2 miles distant from Cocopa Point.

== Geology ==
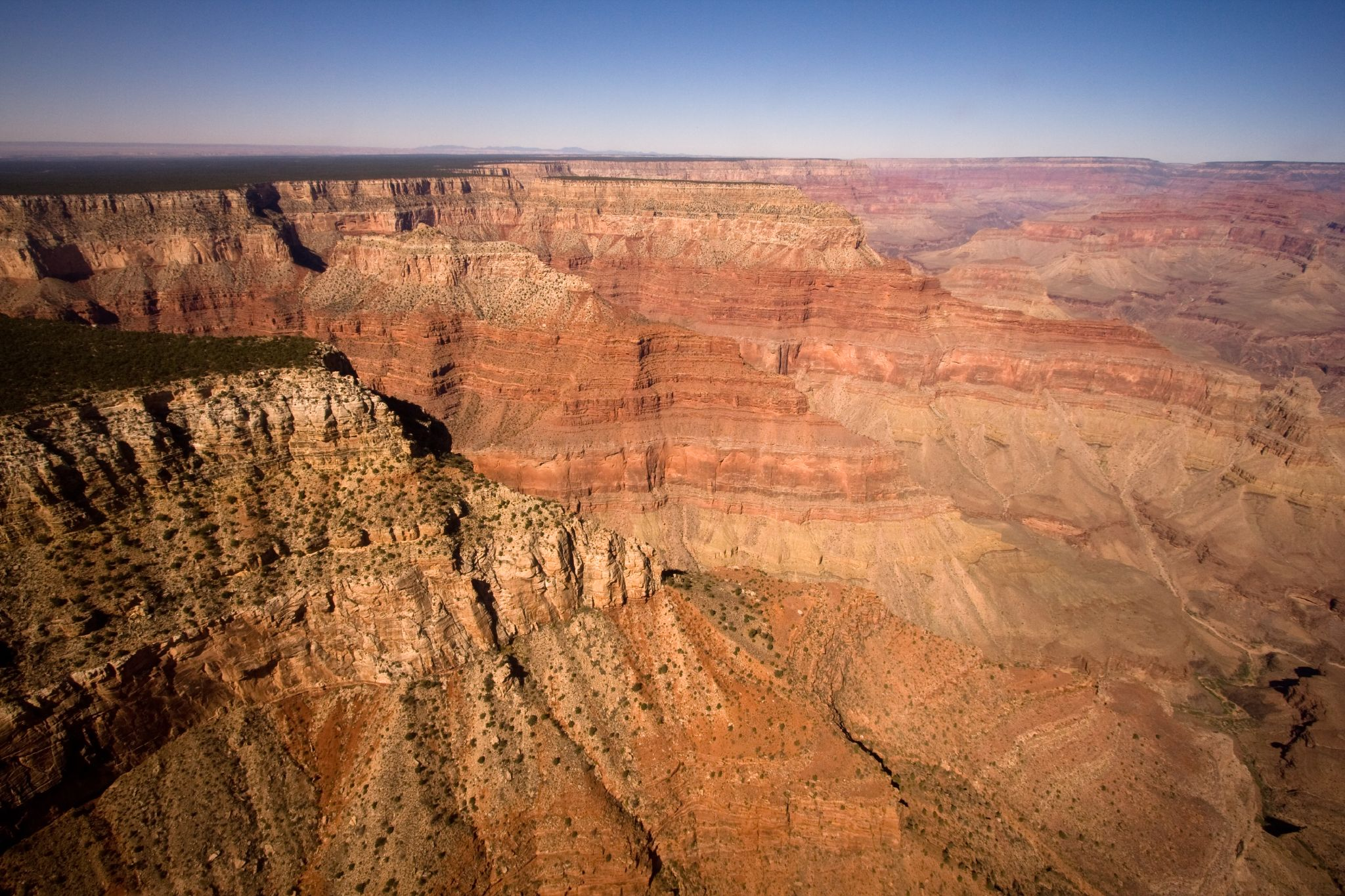
Cocopa Point, with high/angle cliff, down to the red-orange Supai Group, (at headwaters of Travertine Canyon)

The cliff of Cocopa Point is a high-angle cliff of Kaibab Limestone, three rock units below, upon a similar thickness unit of the red-orange Supai Group. The sequence is Kaibab Limestone, on Toroweap Formation, cliffs of Coconino Sandstone, on slopes of dk-burnt-red Hermit Shale. Below is the Supai Group, on cliffs of Redwall Limestone, on members of the Tonto Group, namely, Muav Limestone, Bright Angel Shale, and closer to the Colorado River, short cliffs of Tapeats Sandstone.
