= Diana Temple (Grand Canyon) =

Landform in the Grand Canyon, Arizona

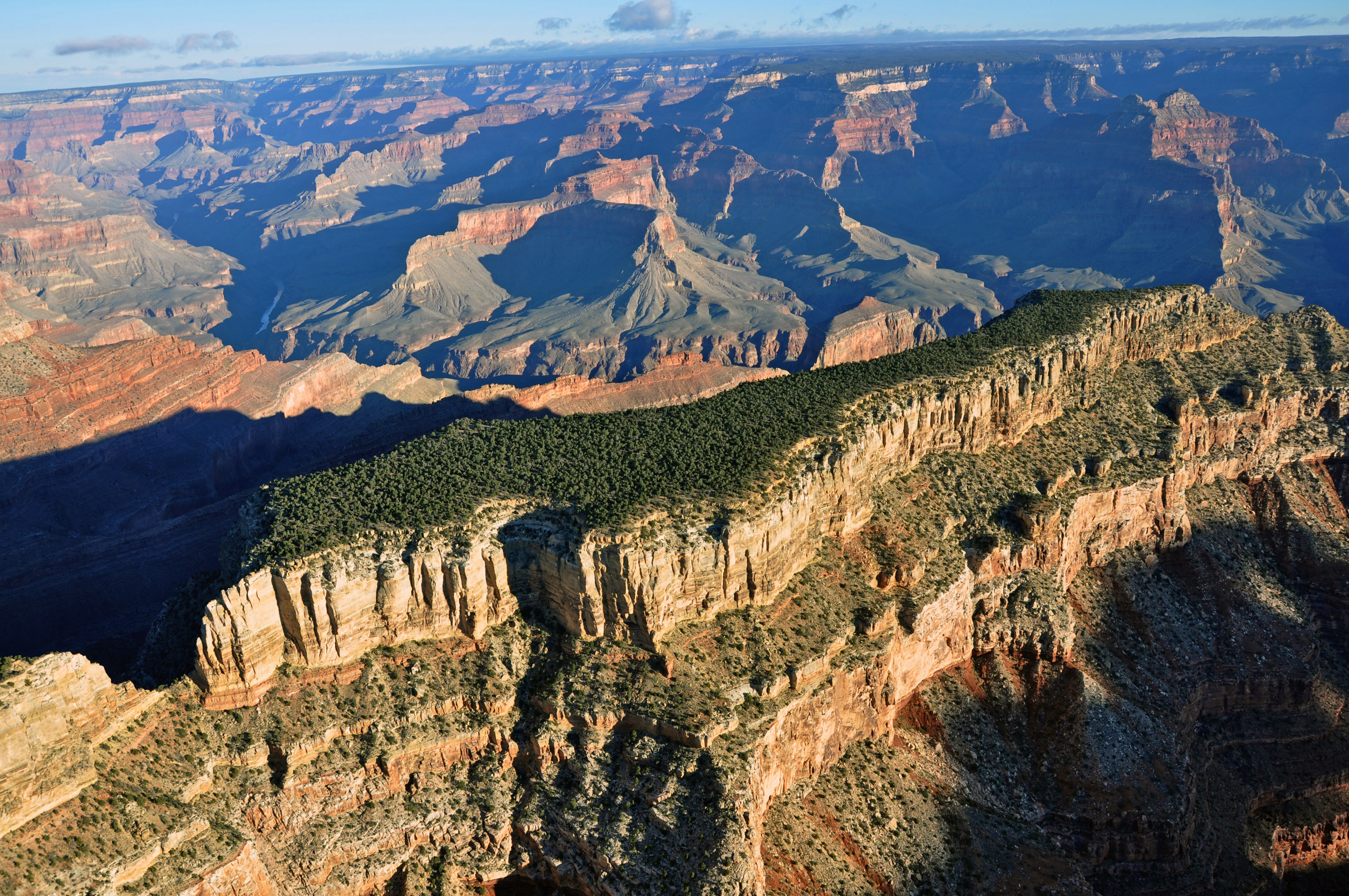
- Aerial view of southeast aspect

Highest point
- Elevation: 6,683 ft (2,037 m)
- Prominence: 412 ft (126 m)
- Parent peak: Mencius Temple (7,001 ft)
- Isolation: 4.93 mi (7.93 km)
- Coordinates: 36°06′43″N 112°16′12″W

Geography
- Location within Arizona Location within the United States
- Country: United States
- State: Arizona
- County: Coconino
- Protected area: Grand Canyon National Park
- Parent range: Coconino Plateau; Colorado Plateau
- Topo map: USGS Piute Point

Geology
- Rock type(s): limestone, sandstone, mudstone

Diana Temple is a 6,683-foot-elevation (2,037-meter) summit located in the Grand Canyon, in Coconino County of northern Arizona, US. It is situated nine miles northwest of Grand Canyon Village, and immediately northeast of Mescalero Point. Pollux Temple is one mile northwest, Marsh Butte one mile east-northeast, and Vesta Temple is one mile south. Topographic relief is significant as Diana Temple rises nearly 4,300 feet (1,300 meters) above the Colorado River in less than two miles. Diana Temple is named for Diana, the goddess of the hunt and the moon according to Roman mythology. Clarence Dutton began the practice of naming geographical features in the Grand Canyon after mythological deities. The U.S. Geological Survey applied the name, and this geographical feature's name was officially adopted in 1908 by the U.S. Board on Geographic Names. In the early 1900s this mesa was sometimes called "No Mans Land". According to the Köppen climate classification system, Diana Temple is located in a Cold semi-arid climate zone.

== Geology ==
The forested top of Diana Temple is composed of Permian Kaibab Limestone overlaying cream-colored, cliff-forming, Permian Coconino Sandstone. The sandstone, which is the third-youngest of the strata in the Grand Canyon, was deposited 265 million years ago as sand dunes. Below the Coconino Sandstone is reddish, slope-forming, Permian Hermit Formation, which in turn overlays the Pennsylvanian-Permian Supai Group. Further down are strata of the conspicuous cliff-forming Mississippian Redwall Limestone, the Cambrian Tonto Group, and finally granite of the Paleoproterozoic Vishnu Basement Rocks at river level in Granite Gorge. Precipitation runoff from Diana Temple drains east to the Colorado River via Slate Creek on the north side of the mesa, and Topaz Canyon on the south side.

== See also ==
- Geology of the Grand Canyon area

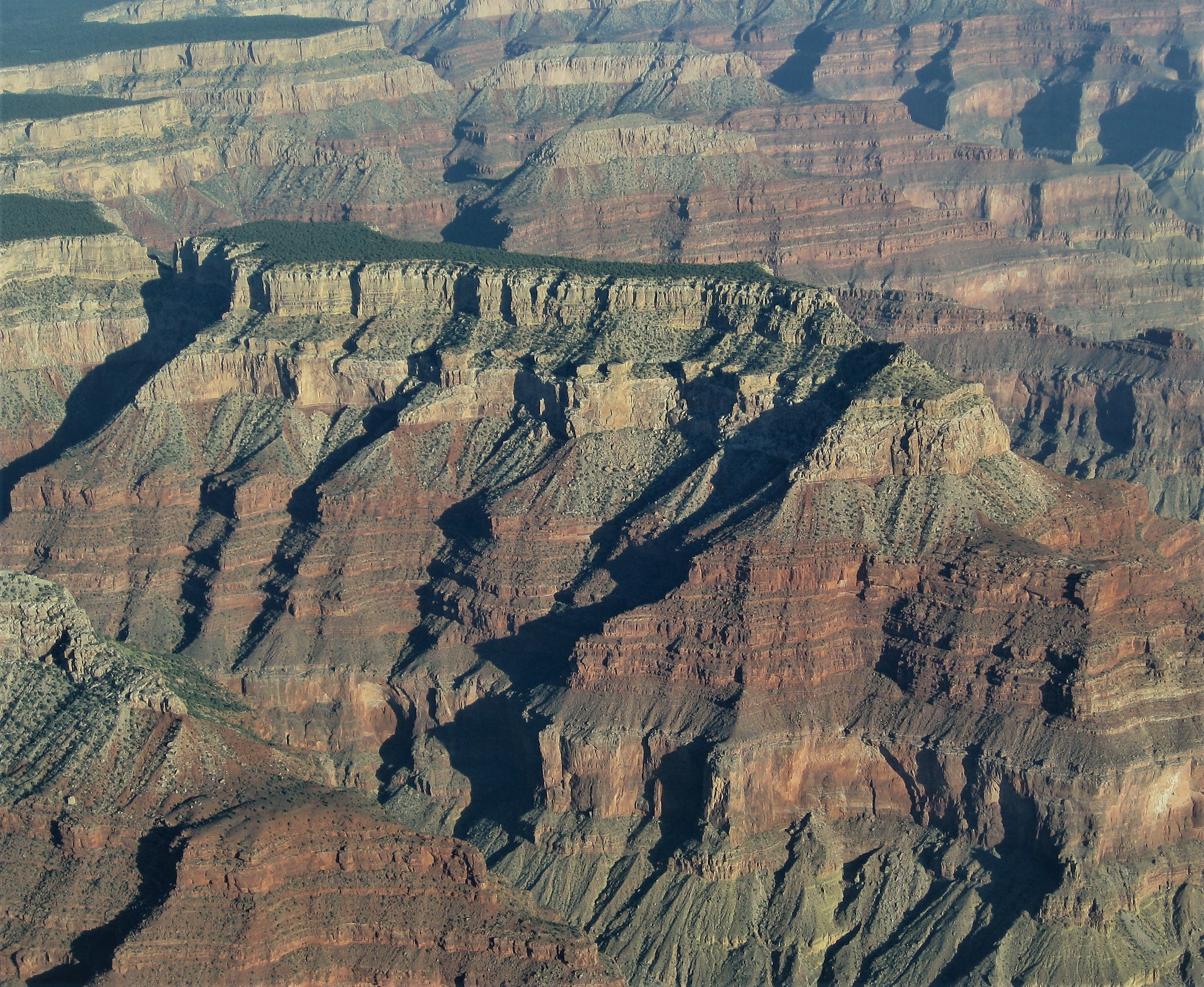
Diana Temple, east aspect from the air

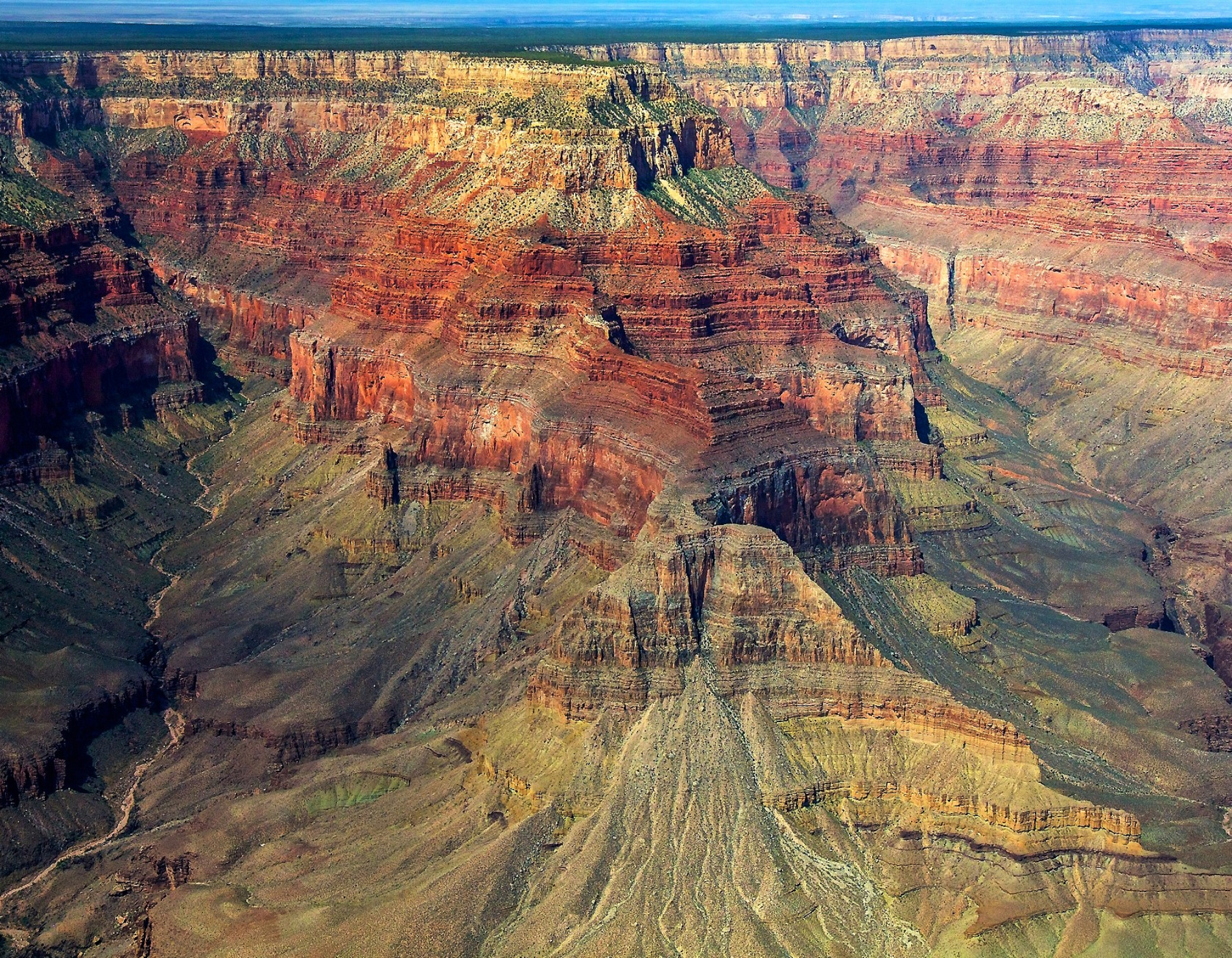
Diana Temple, with Marsh Butte centered below
