= Darwin Plateau =

Plateau in Arizona (western Grand Canyon)

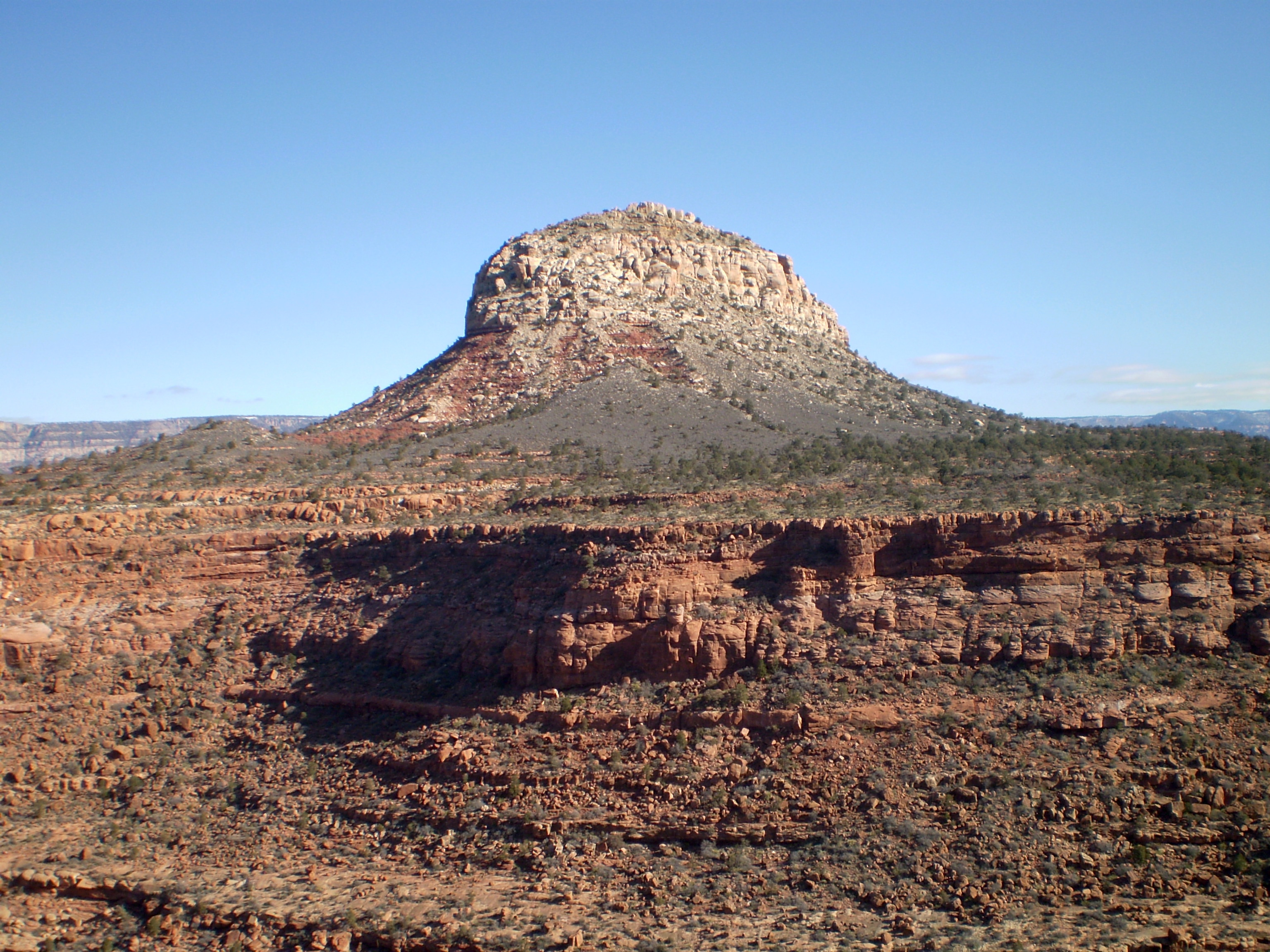
- Mount Huethawali upon the Darwin Plateau

- Location within Arizona
- Floor elevation: 5,508 ft (1,679 m)
- Length: ~1.25 ;mi ~circular (surrounding Mount Huethawali)
- Width: ~1.25 mi

Geography
- Location: (west)-Grand Canyon, (northern)-Arizona, United States
- Coordinates: 36°12′04″N 112°23′12″W
- Topo map: Explorers Monument, USGS
- Rivers: Garnet Creek, Copper Creek (Arizona)-(Evolution Amphitheater), Bass Creek (Arizona)
- Interactive map of Darwin Plateau

Darwin Plateau is a mostly circular, small plateau, about 0.75 mi to 1.25 miles in diameter surrounding the base of Mount Huethawali; the Huethawali prominence occupies about one quarter of the Darwin Plateau. South of the prominence, the Darwin Plateau borders Huethawali on the southwest, south, and southeast, with the southwest forming a saddle between Garnet Canyon (Upper Canyon, and the northeast of Drummond Plateau), the southwest terminus of the Grand Scenic Divide, and east, the saddle at the headwaters of the southwest terminus of Upper Bass Canyon (the location of the South Bass Trail).

The Darwin Plateau is about 0.75 miles northwest of the southwest terminus of the Grand Scenic Divide, and is located about 2.0 miles east of excursions of the Colorado River.

North of Mount Huethawali are two landforms identical in approximate elevations to Darwin Plateau, namely Spencer Terrace, north-northwest, and Huxley Terrace, northeast (the west border of the Grand Scenic Divide, across Upper Bass Canyon). Spencer and Huxley Terrace's, and the Darwin Plateau, are composed of unit 4 of 4 of the Supai Group, the cliff-former, (and platform-former), Esplanade Sandstone. (Trail guides, (for example from Grand Canyon trip reports,) refer to the trails being on “the Esplanade”); The Esplanade (Grand Canyon) is a large platform across from Toroweap Overlook, downstream, and on the South Rim.

== See also ==
- Geology of the Grand Canyon area
- Grand Scenic Divide
- Wallace Butte
