= Steamboat Mountain (Coconino County, Arizona) =

Landform in the Grand Canyon, Arizona, United States

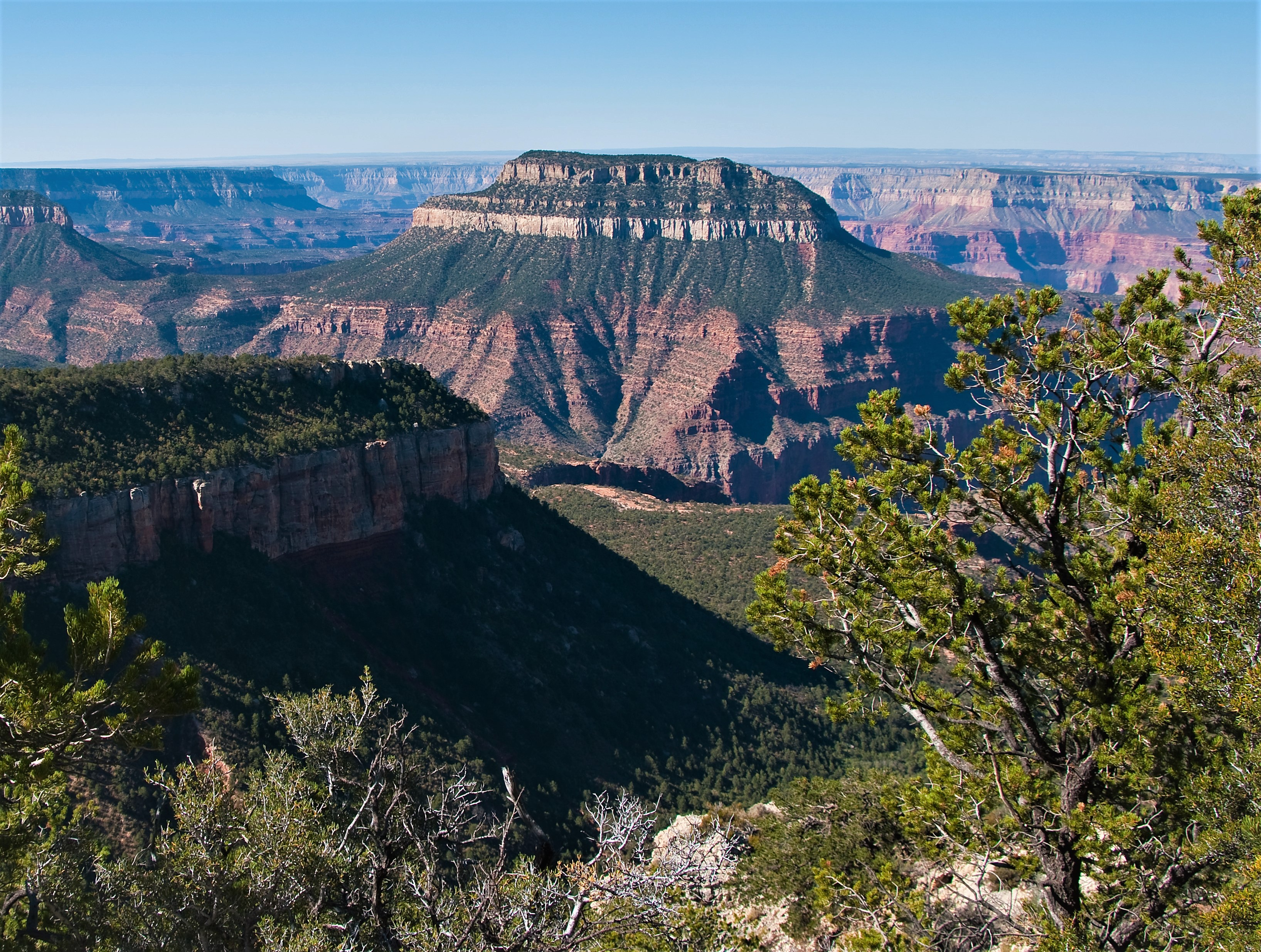
- Northeast aspect, from Locust Point

Highest point
- Elevation: 7,410 ft (2,260 m)
- Prominence: 1,370 ft (420 m)
- Parent peak: Powell Plateau (7,661 ft)
- Isolation: 2.48 mi (3.99 km)
- Coordinates: 36°21′57″N 112°23′56″W

Geography
- Location within Arizona Location within the United States
- Location: Grand Canyon National Park; Coconino County, Arizona, US
- Parent range: Kaibab Plateau; Colorado Plateau
- Topo map: USGS Powell Plateau

Geology
- Rock type(s): sandstone, limestone, mudstone

Climbing
- First ascent: October 17, 1964 Harvey Butchart, Marshall Demick

Steamboat Mountain is a 7,410-foot-elevation (2,260-meter) summit located in the Grand Canyon, in Coconino County of northern Arizona, US. It is situated four miles northwest of Holy Grail Temple, and 2.5 miles west-southwest of Timp Point on the North Rim. George Wharton James described it as a "majestic butte", nearly encircled by Galloway and Saddle Canyons. Topographic relief is significant as it rises over 5,400 feet (1,600 meters) above the Colorado River in three miles. According to the Köppen climate classification system, Steamboat Mountain is located in a Cold semi-arid climate zone, with precipitation runoff draining west to the Colorado River via Tapeats Creek and Stone Creek. This feature's name was officially adopted in 1932 by the U.S. Board on Geographic Names.

== History ==
In 1858, Lieutenant Joseph Ives led an expedition up the Colorado River, starting at the river's mouth and making it to the lower Grand Canyon. The mode of transportation was a steamboat named Explorer. Steamboat Mountain is located in an area of geographical features that were named after the canyon's early explorers. Steamboat Mountain is set at the northern tip of Powell Plateau, named for John Wesley Powell. Ives Point lies six miles to the southwest at the southwest tip of Powell Plateau. Also on Powell Plateau are Newberry Point, Dutton Point, Wheeler Point, Thompson Point, and Beale Point. These Grand Canyon pioneers are collectively commemorated by Explorers Monument, located immediately south of Powell Plateau.

== Geology ==
Steamboat Mountain is composed of Permian Kaibab Limestone, overlaying a conspicuous band of cream-colored, cliff-forming, Permian Coconino Sandstone. The sandstone, which is the third-youngest of the strata in the Grand Canyon, was deposited 265 million years ago as sand dunes. Below the conspicuous Coconino Sandstone layer is slope-forming, Permian Hermit Formation, which in turn overlays the Pennsylvanian-Permian Supai Group. Further down are strata of Mississippian Redwall Limestone, the Cambrian Tonto Group, and finally Paleoproterozoic Vishnu Basement Rocks at river level in Granite Gorge.

== See also ==
- Explorer (steamboat)
- Steamboats of the Colorado River
- Geology of the Grand Canyon area

== Gallery ==
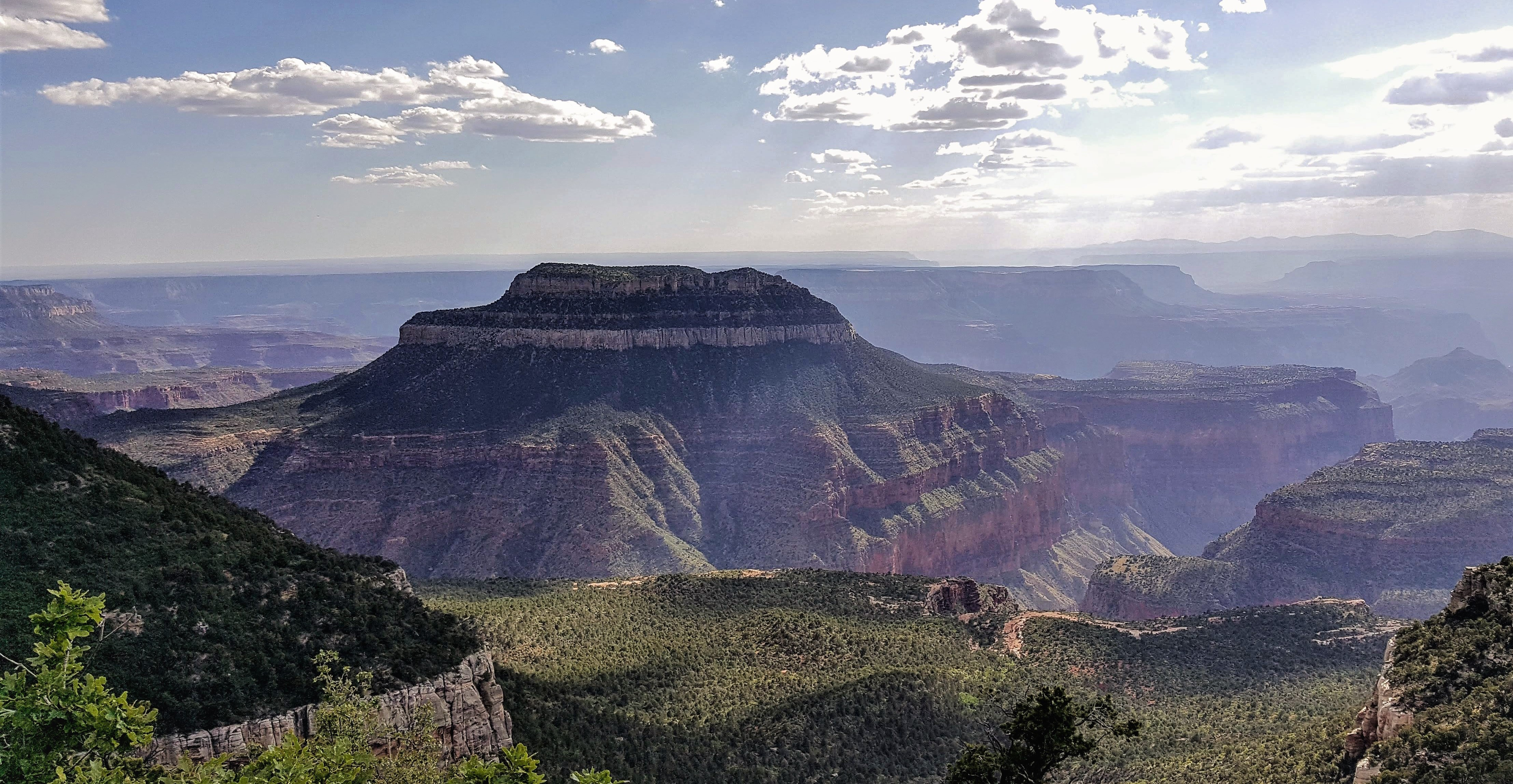
Steamboat Mountain from Timp Point

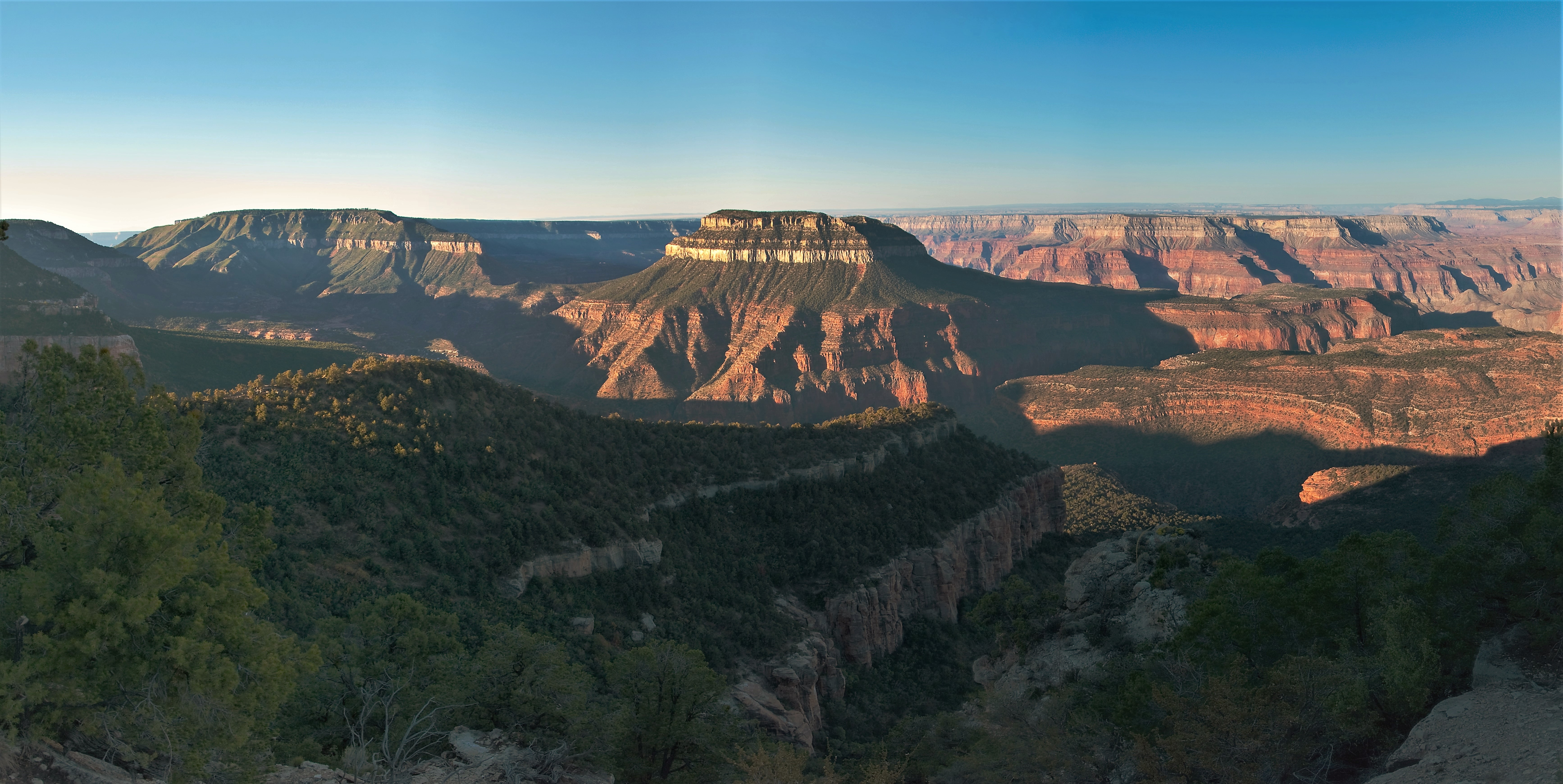
Steamboat Mountain

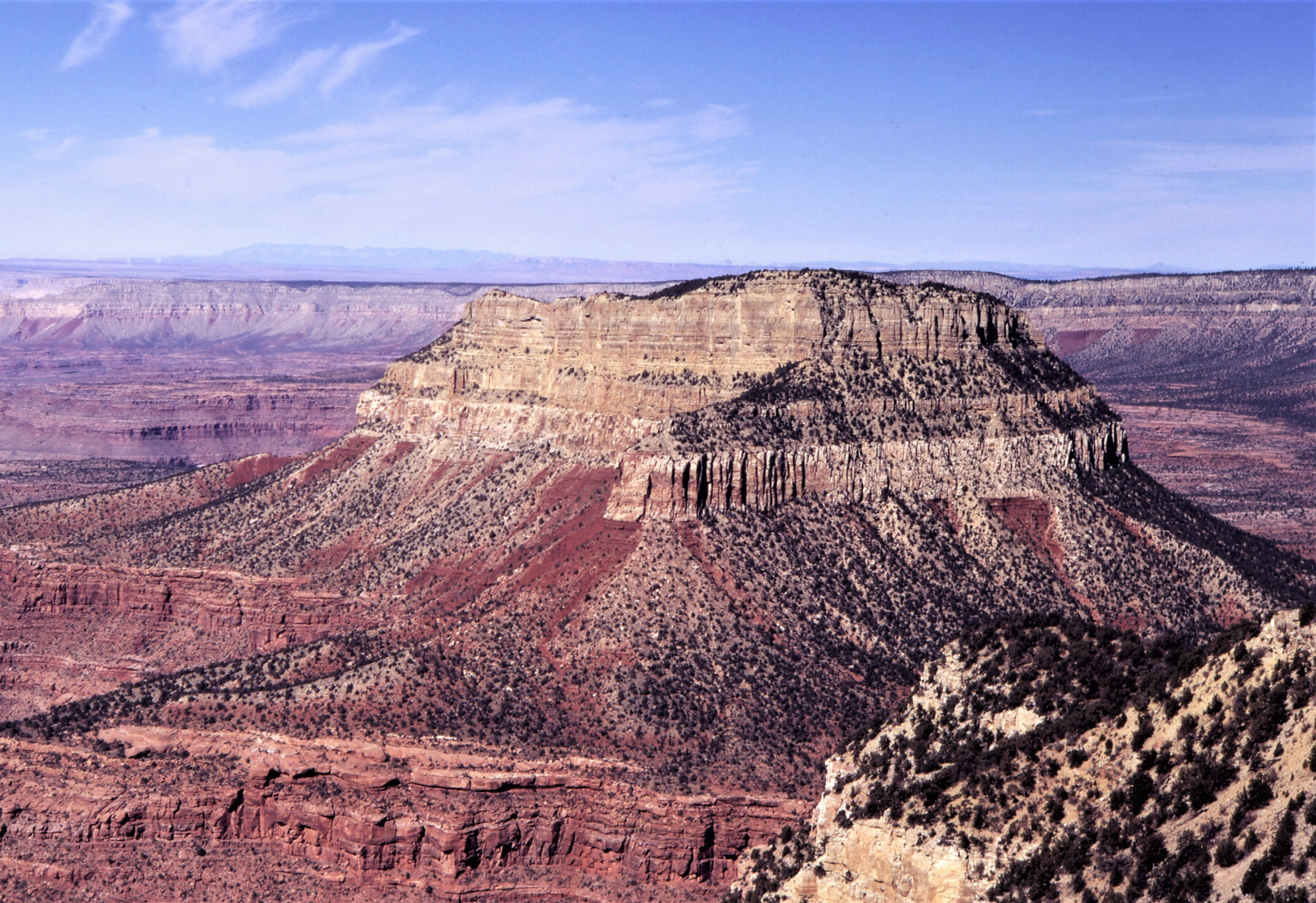
View northwest toward Steamboat Mountain from north end of Powell Plateau. 1969
