= Wallace Butte =

Summit in the Grand Canyon, Coconino County, Arizona

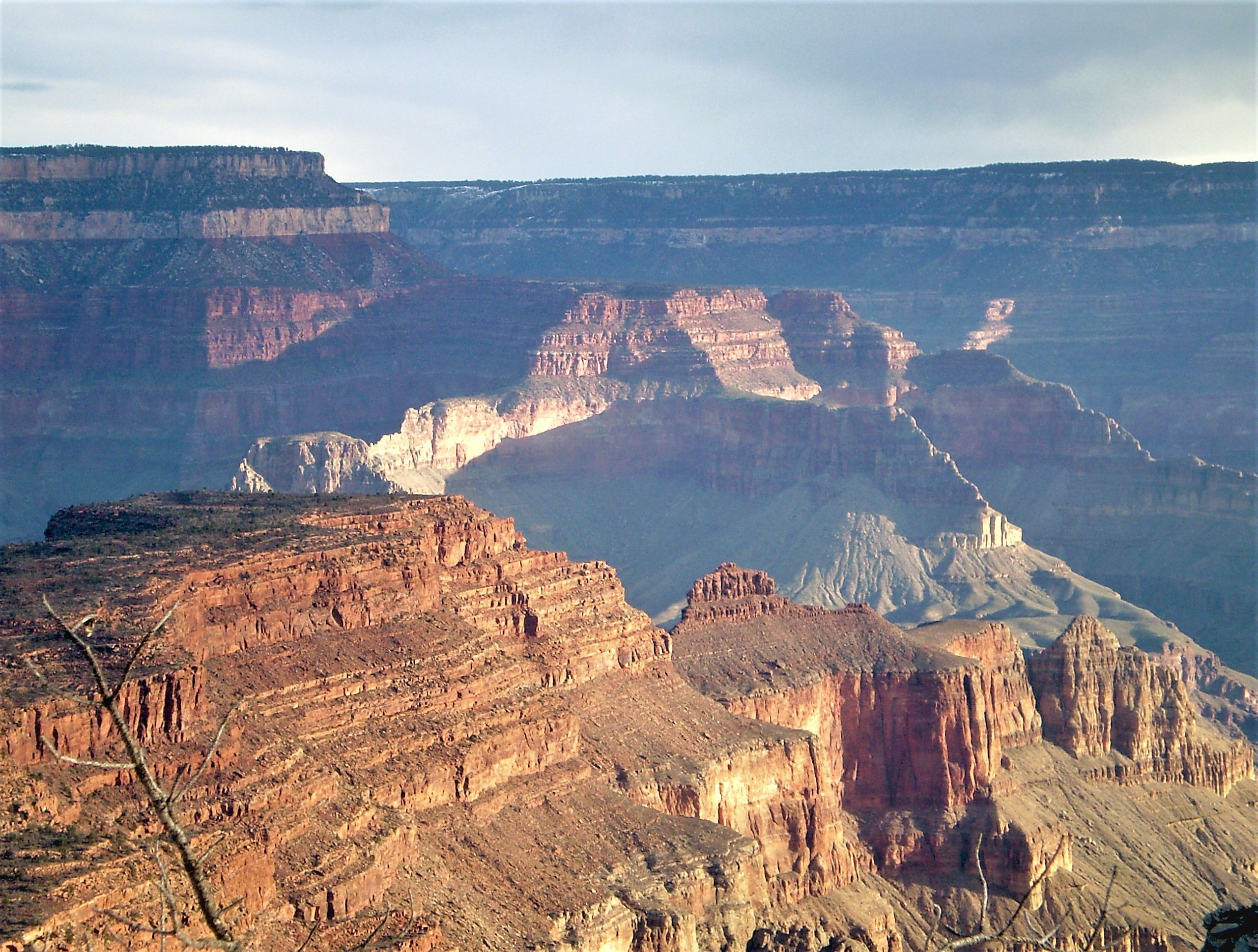
- Huxley Terrace & Wallace Butte (foreground)

Highest point
- Elevation: 5,209 ft (1,588 m)
- Prominence: 349 ft (106 m)
- Parent peak: Mount Huethawali
- Isolation: 1.73 mi (2.78 km)
- Coordinates: 36.21248°N 112.37268°W

Naming
- Etymology: Alfred Russel Wallace

Geography
- Location within Arizona Location within the United States
- Location: Grand Canyon National Park; Coconino County, Arizona, US
- Parent range: Coconino Plateau, Colorado Plateau
- Topo map: USGS Havasupai Point

Geology
- Rock age: Pennsylvanian down to Cambrian
- Mountain type(s): sedimentary rock: sandstone, siltstone, mudstone, limestone, shale
- Rock type(s): Manakacha Formation-(Supai unit 2: prominence-(upper unit); Watahomigi Formation-(lower unit); Supai Group-(units 2, 1); Redwall Limestone, Muav Limestone, Bright Angel Shale

Wallace Butte is a 5,209-foot (1,588 m)-elevation summit located in western Grand Canyon, in Coconino County of northern Arizona, United States. It is located on the South Rim, about 1.0 mile northwest of the Grand Scenic Divide across Bass Canyon. Wallace Butte is 1.73 miles northeast of Mount Huethawali, and the butte lies about 3/4 mile south of the west-flowing Colorado River.

== Geology ==
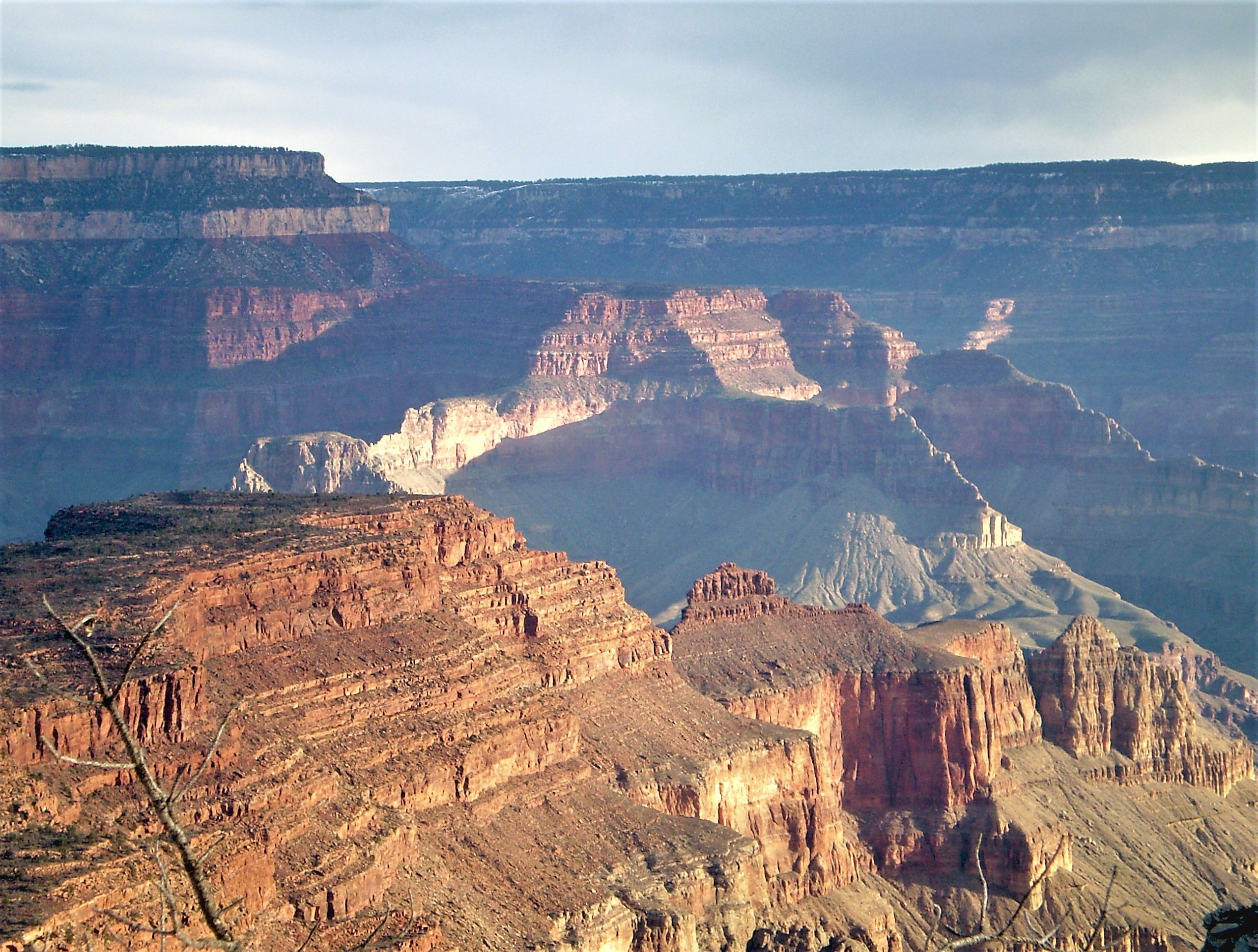
Huxley Terrace (elevation highpoint – 5630 ft) and the remnant, small, massif of Wallace Butte (5209 ft)

The large Huxley Terrace (photo), is composed of the Supai Group – 4 units. Notably, rock units 4 and 2 are cliff-formers, and the entire Supai Group sits on the cliff-former (and platform-former) of the Redwall Limestone.

For Wallace Butte, geologically it is a cliff and slope-former remainder – of Supai Group units 2 and 1 (Manakacha Formation, Watahomigi Formation). The cliffs of the Manakacha protect the slope-former below; (with the height of 349 ft, the landform is triangular, thin, and ~350 ft long, by ~150 ft wide); (See here:) both units are on the top platform of the Redwall, the Redwall Limestone upper platform being a common rock unit throughout the Grand Canyon as landform points, (surrounding prominences), or as platforms supporting numerous rock units above, nearby examples being Geikie Peak and Whites Butte.
