= Mount Huethawali =

Landform in the Grand Canyon, Arizona

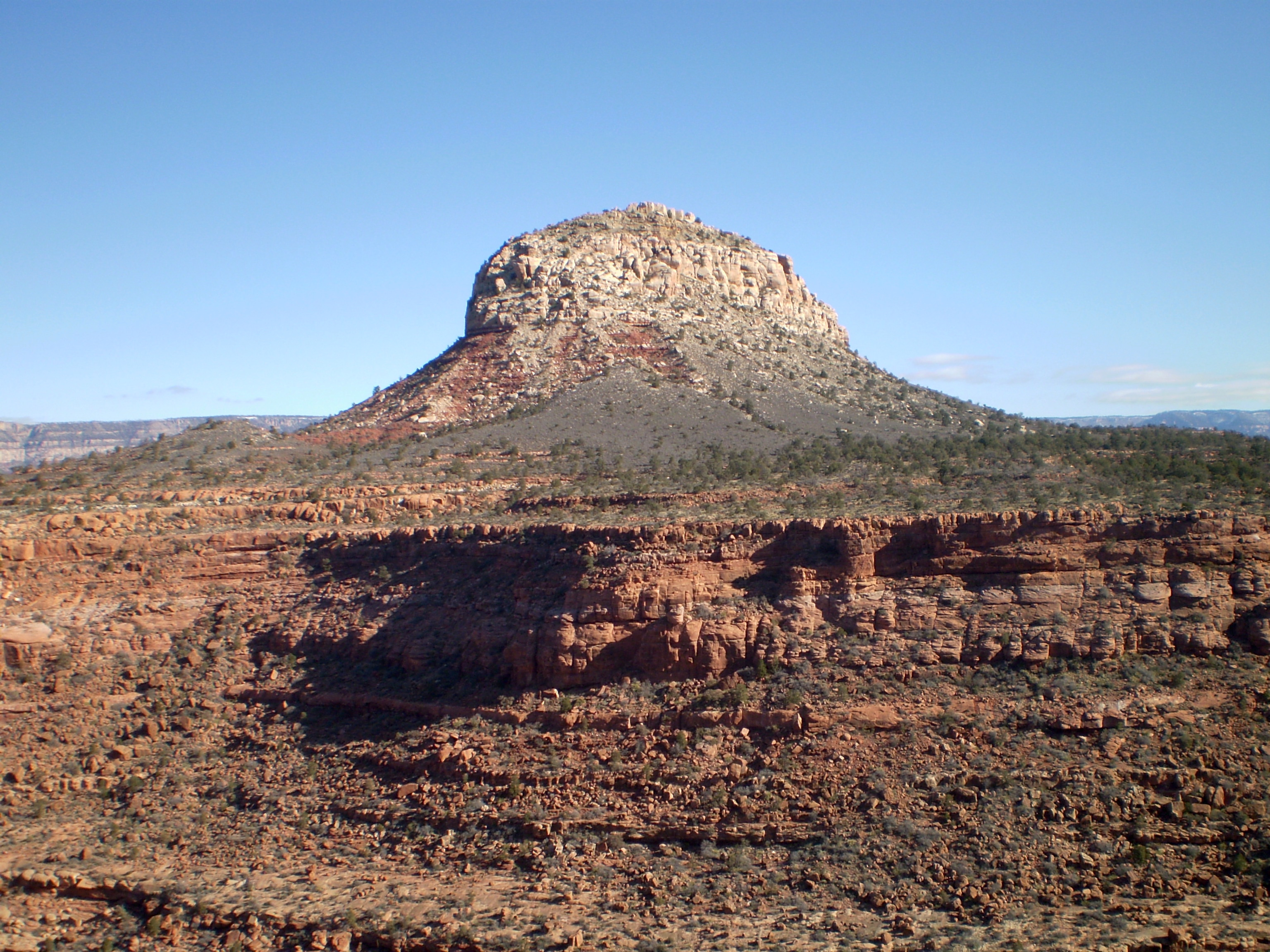
- Southwest aspect

Highest point
- Elevation: 6,281 ft (1,914 m)
- Prominence: 961 ft (293 m)
- Parent peak: Fossil Mountain (6,729 ft)
- Isolation: 1.52 mi (2.45 km)
- Coordinates: 36°12′15″N 112°22′55″W

Geography
- Location within Arizona Location within the United States
- Country: United States
- State: Arizona
- County: Coconino
- Protected area: Grand Canyon National Park
- Parent range: Coconino Plateau; Colorado Plateau
- Topo map: USGS Explorers Monument

Geology
- Rock type(s): sandstone, siltstone, mudstone

Climbing
- First ascent: 1898
- Easiest route: class 3 scrambling SW slope

Mount Huethawali is a 6,281-foot-elevation (1,914-meter) summit located in the Grand Canyon, in Coconino County of northern Arizona, US. It is situated 3.5 miles due east of Explorers Monument, 1.5 mile west of Grand Scenic Divide, and immediately southwest of Huxley Terrace. Surrounded by Garnet, Evolution, and Bass Canyons, Huethawali rises over 800 feet (240 meters) above Darwin Plateau, and over 4,000 feet higher than the nearby Colorado River.

The summit dome is composed of cream-colored Permian Coconino Sandstone. This sandstone, which is the third-youngest stratum in the Grand Canyon, was deposited 265 million years ago as sand dunes. Below the Coconino Sandstone is reddish, slope-forming, Permian Hermit Formation, which in turn overlays the Pennsylvanian-Permian Supai Group. Further down are strata of the cliff-forming Mississippian Redwall Limestone, Cambrian Tonto Group, and finally Proterozoic Unkar Group at river level.

According to the Köppen climate classification system, Mount Huethawali is located in a cold semi-arid climate zone.

== History ==
The first ascent of the summit was made in August 1898 by William Wallace Bass and George Wharton James. James originally named it Mount Observation, but wrote that Indians called this mountain "Hue-tha-wa-li" (pronounced "we-the-wally"), which means White Rock Mountain. Some sources state that "Huethawali" is the Native American word for "observation point", while other sources state it translates as "white tower" or "white rock mountain" in the Havasupai language. This butte's name was officially adopted in 1932 by the U.S. Board on Geographic Names.

== Gallery ==
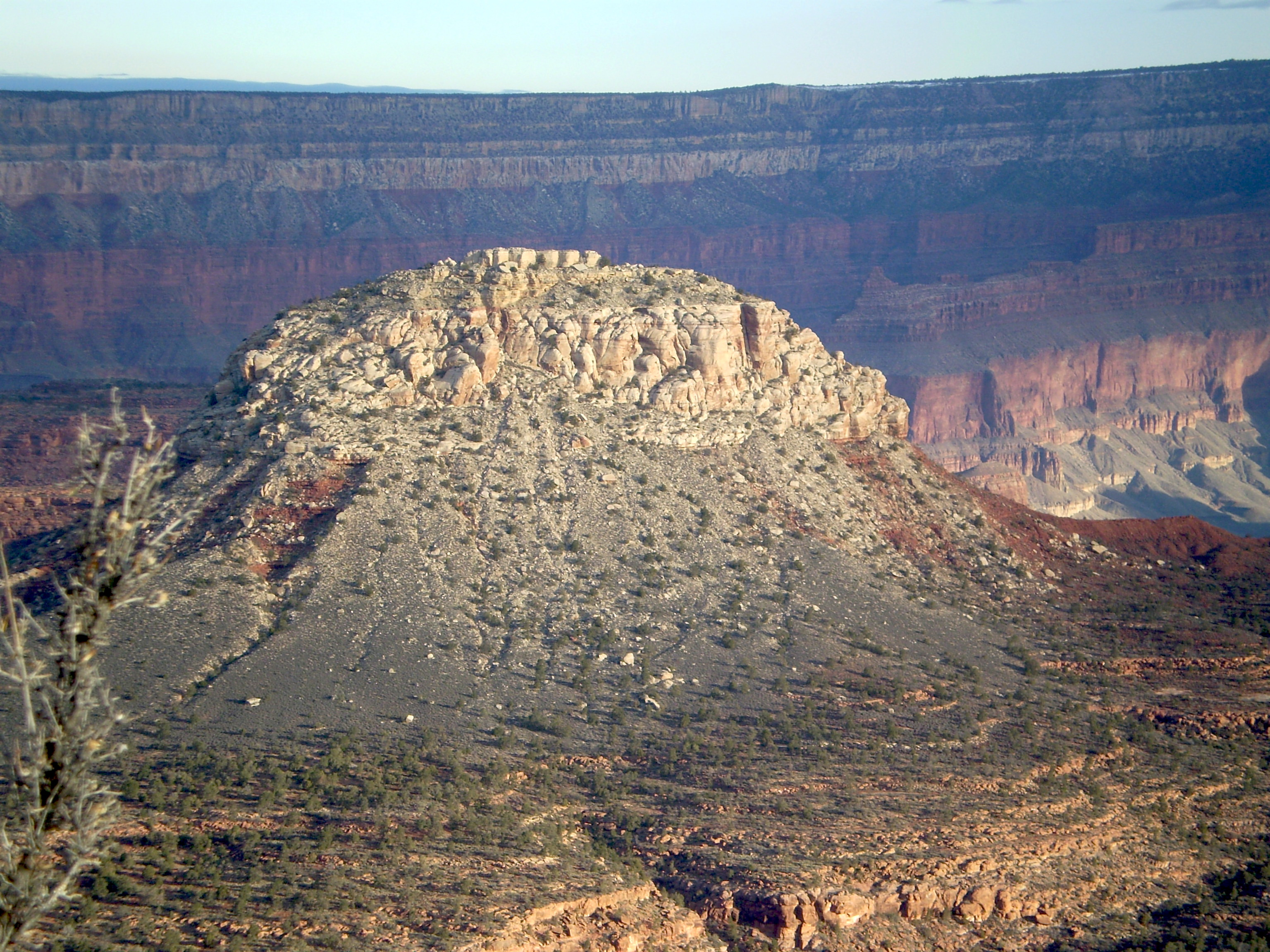
South aspect

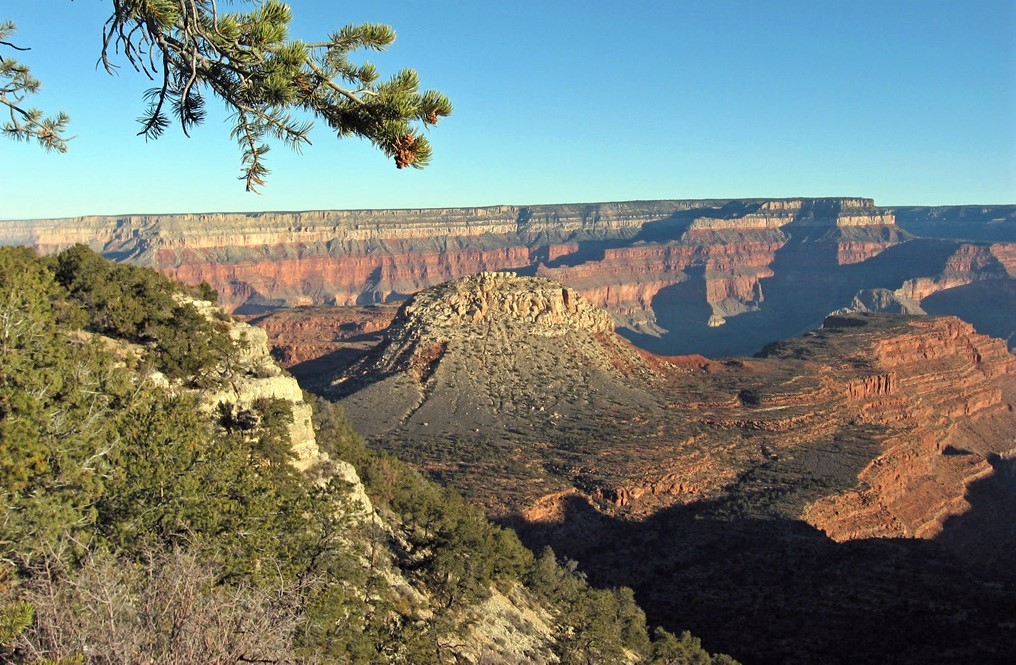
Mt. Huethawali and Huxley Terrace seen from South Bass Trail

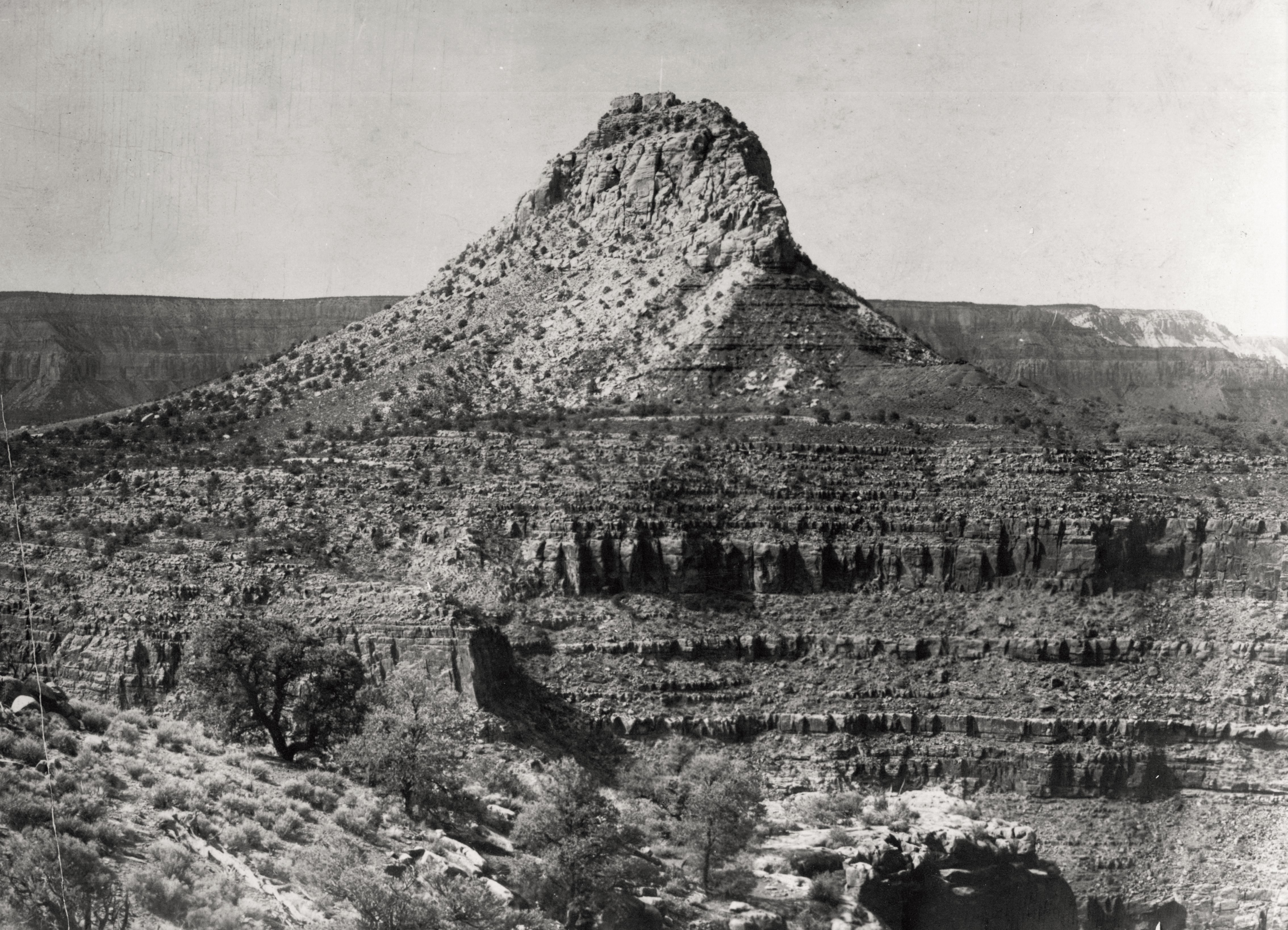
1901, east aspect

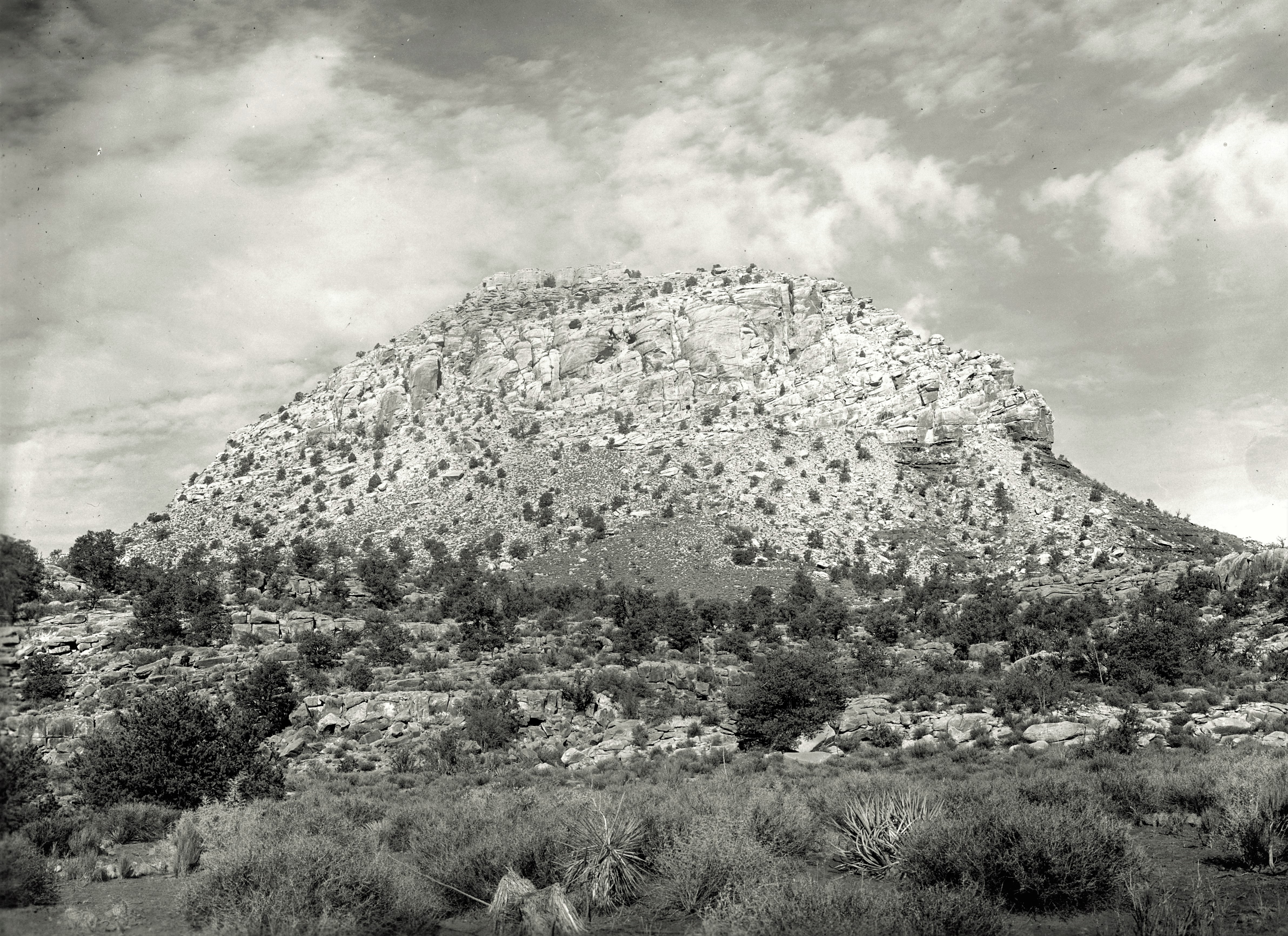
circa 1901

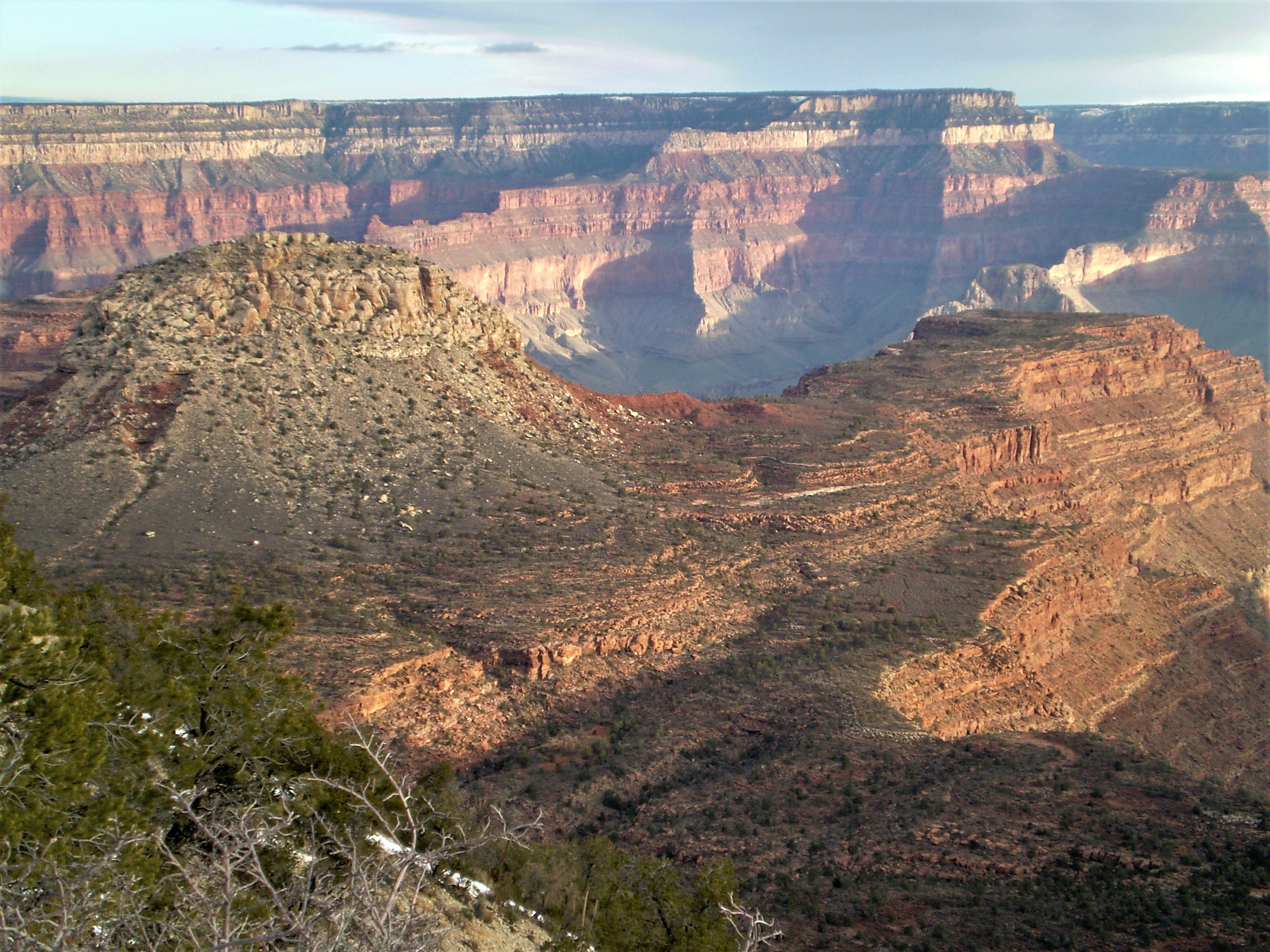
Mount Huethawali (left) and Huxley Terrace (right),
with Powell Plateau in the distance.

== See also ==
- Geology of the Grand Canyon area
- History of the Grand Canyon area
