= Explorers' Monument =

Explorers' Monument may refer to:

- Westland Explorers' Monument (aka Explorers' Monument), an 1868 obelisk in Hokitika, New Zealand
- Explorers' Monument (Western Australia), a 1913 monument in Fremantle, Australia
- Explorers Monument (Grand Canyon), a summit in the Grand Canyon in Arizona, United States
