= Huxley Terrace =

Plateau in Arizona (western Grand Canyon)

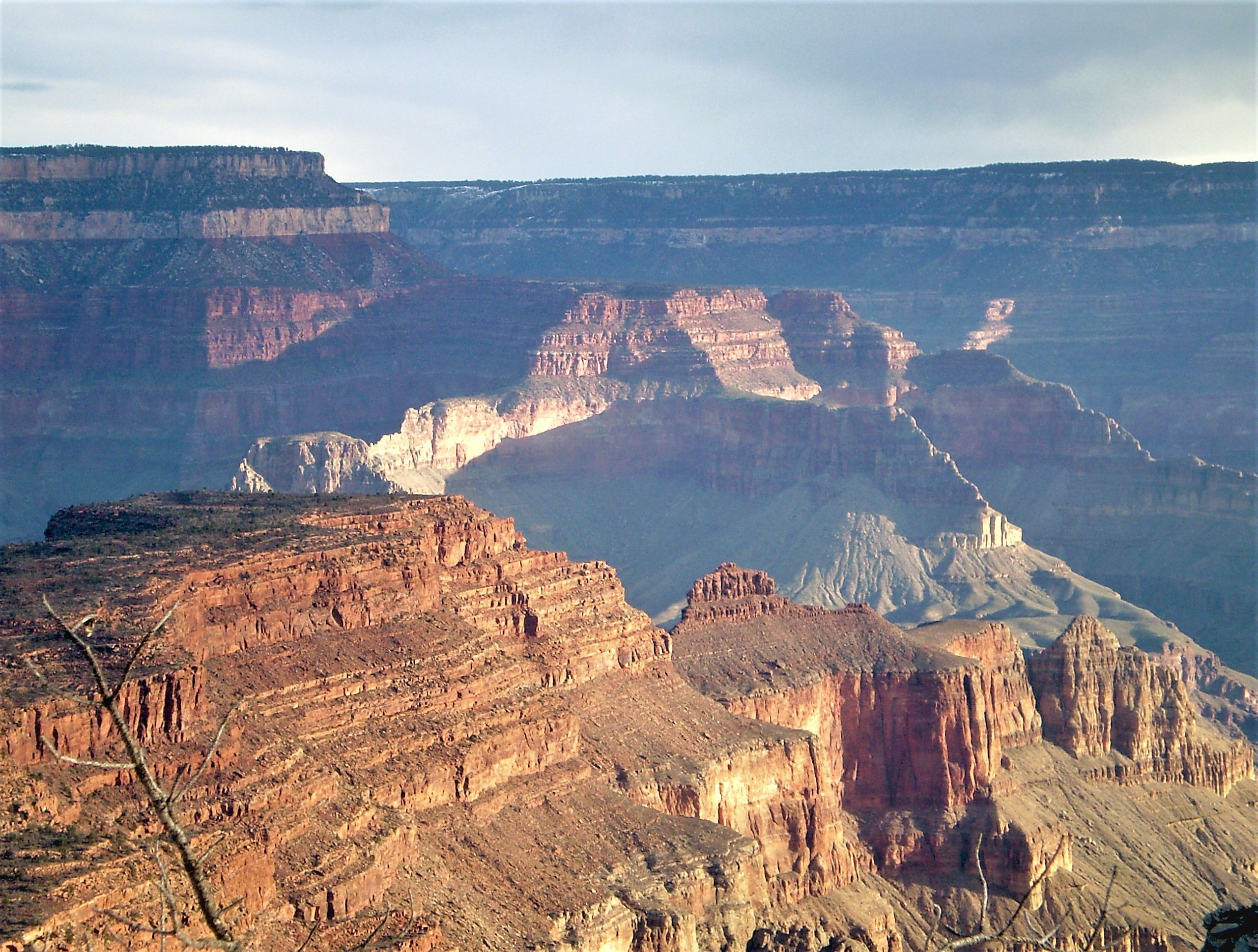
- (massif)-northeast terminus of Huxley Terrace (Upper Bass Canyon-(right)); Masonic Temple, north across Colorado River

- Location within Arizona
- Floor elevation: 5,630 ft (1,720 m)
- Length: ~1.2 mi northeast (connected to Mount Huethawali)
- Width: ~0.3 mi

Geography
- Location: (west)-Grand Canyon, (northern)-Arizona, United States
- Coordinates: 36°12′45″N 112°22′22″W
- Topo map: Explorers Monument, USGS
- Rivers: Copper Creek (Arizona)-(Evolution Amphitheater), Bass Creek (Arizona)
- Interactive map of Huxley Terrace

Huxley Terrace is a narrow, linear mesa-like platform extending northeast from Mount Huethawali in western Grand Canyon on the South Rim; (it is about 1.2 mi in length). Three landforms surround Mount Huethawali; the Darwin Plateau extends southwest (but is actually a semicircle platform at the south); two terraces are at the north of Huethawali, Spencer Terrace extends north-northwest, and Huxley Terrace extends northeast.

The center of Huxley Terrace is ~1.0 mile from Mount Huethawali, and ~1.0 mile northwest of the southwest end of the Grand Scenic Divide. Huxley Terrace is about 2.0 miles south of a west-flowing excursion of the Colorado River. This short excursion of the Colorado River is west of the Grand Scenic Divide with the three terraces, two major canyons/creeks, and a more minor canyon between Spencer and Huxley Terrace. This narrow minor canyon and watershed, is high-walled, and narrow, (Copper Creek (Arizona)), and the Upper Copper Canyon is named the Evolution Amphitheater.

== Geography/Geology ==
Unlike Spencer Terrace to the west, which slopes westward to Upper Garnet Canyon (as does the Darwin Plateau just southeast), Huxley Terrace is mostly flat. The highpoint of the terrace is at the northeast above a large section at 5600 ft-elevation, the prominence being 5,630 ft. A saddle occurs on the terrace, about one third of the distance northeast of Mount Huethawali, just below the 5440 ft-elevation.

=== Geology ===
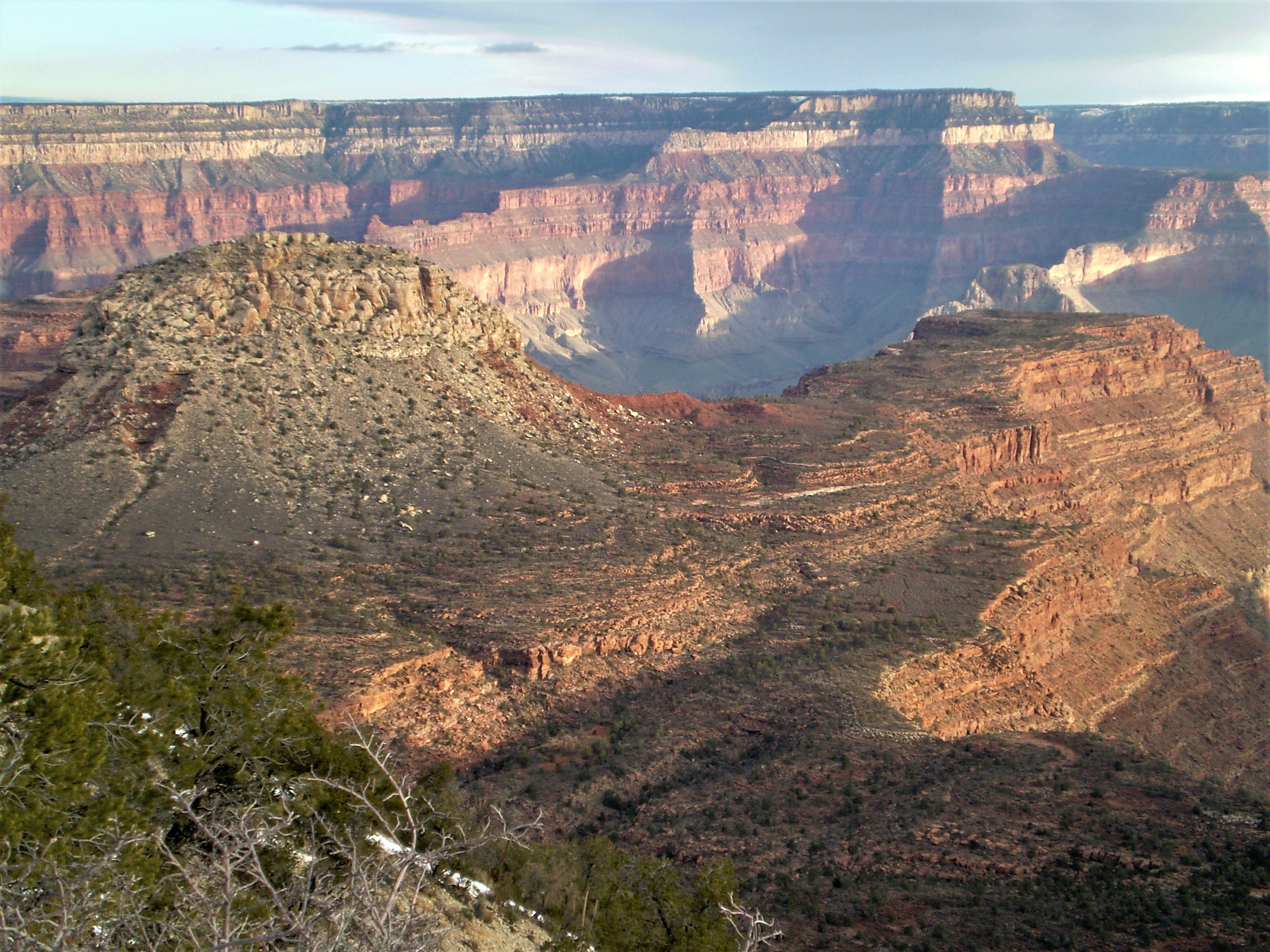
Mount Huethawali, left, & Huxley Terrace, (with its saddle and prominence on northeast terminus)

Huxley Terrace is a massif of the Supai Group; specifically, it survives because of unit 4 of 4, the cliff-former, (platform-former) Esplanade Sandstone. (The three platforms of Spencer Terrace, Huxley Terrace, and the Darwin Plateau, are all composed of the Esplanade Sandstone.) Mount Huethawali is a large cliff of Coconino Sandstone upon a slope of thick Hermit Shale, both upon the Supai Group (Esplanade Sandstone). The north terminus of Huxley Terrace, at its highpoint, has colorful dk-burnt-brick red erosion debris from the Hermit Shale. (See here:) The best exposures of the cliffs of the Esplanade Sandstone are at the terraces perimeters.

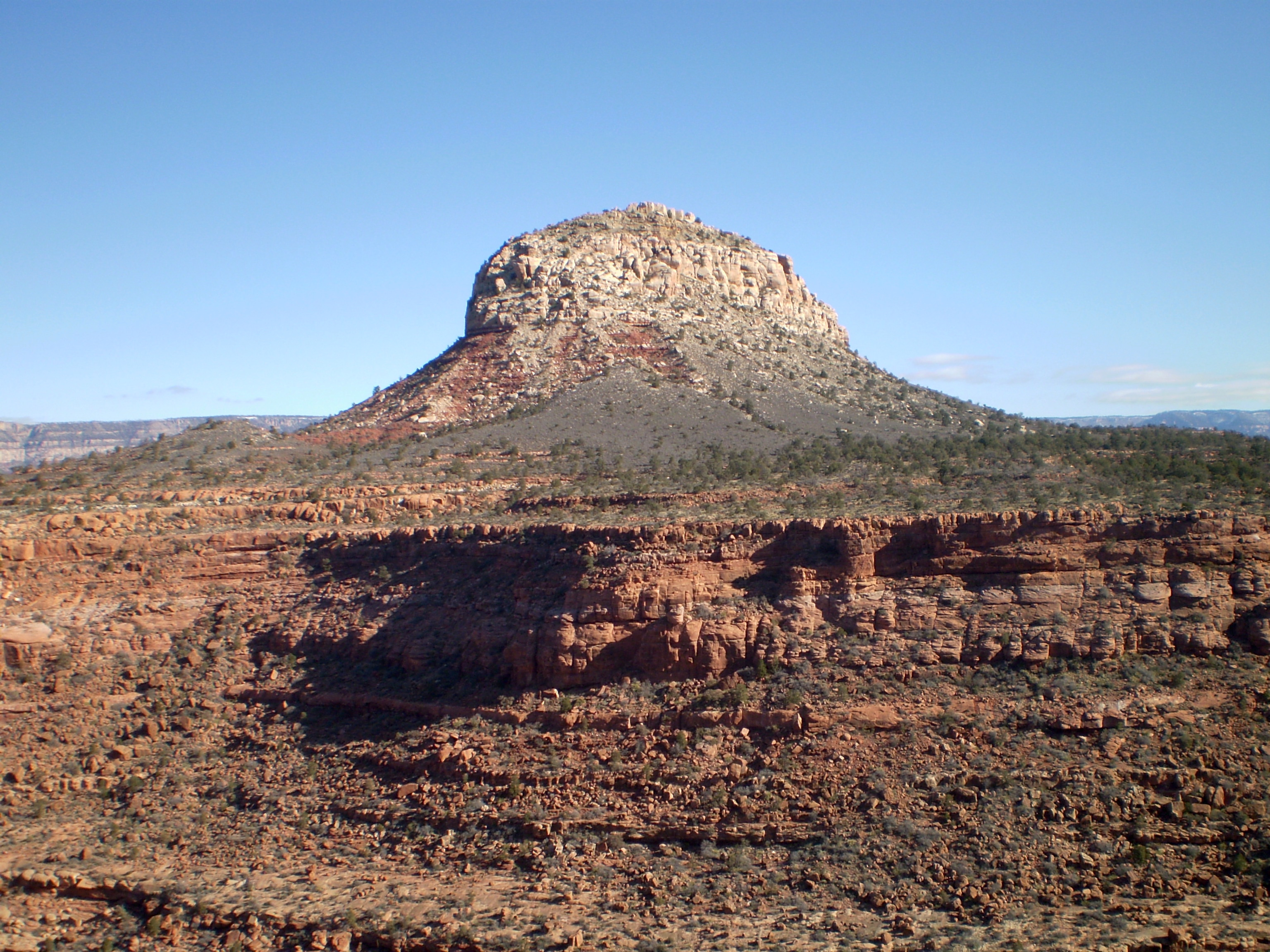
cliff of Esplanade Sandstone at Upper Garnet Canyon (southwest Darwin Plateau)
