= Fossil Mountain (Grand Canyon) =

Summit in Coconino County, Arizona

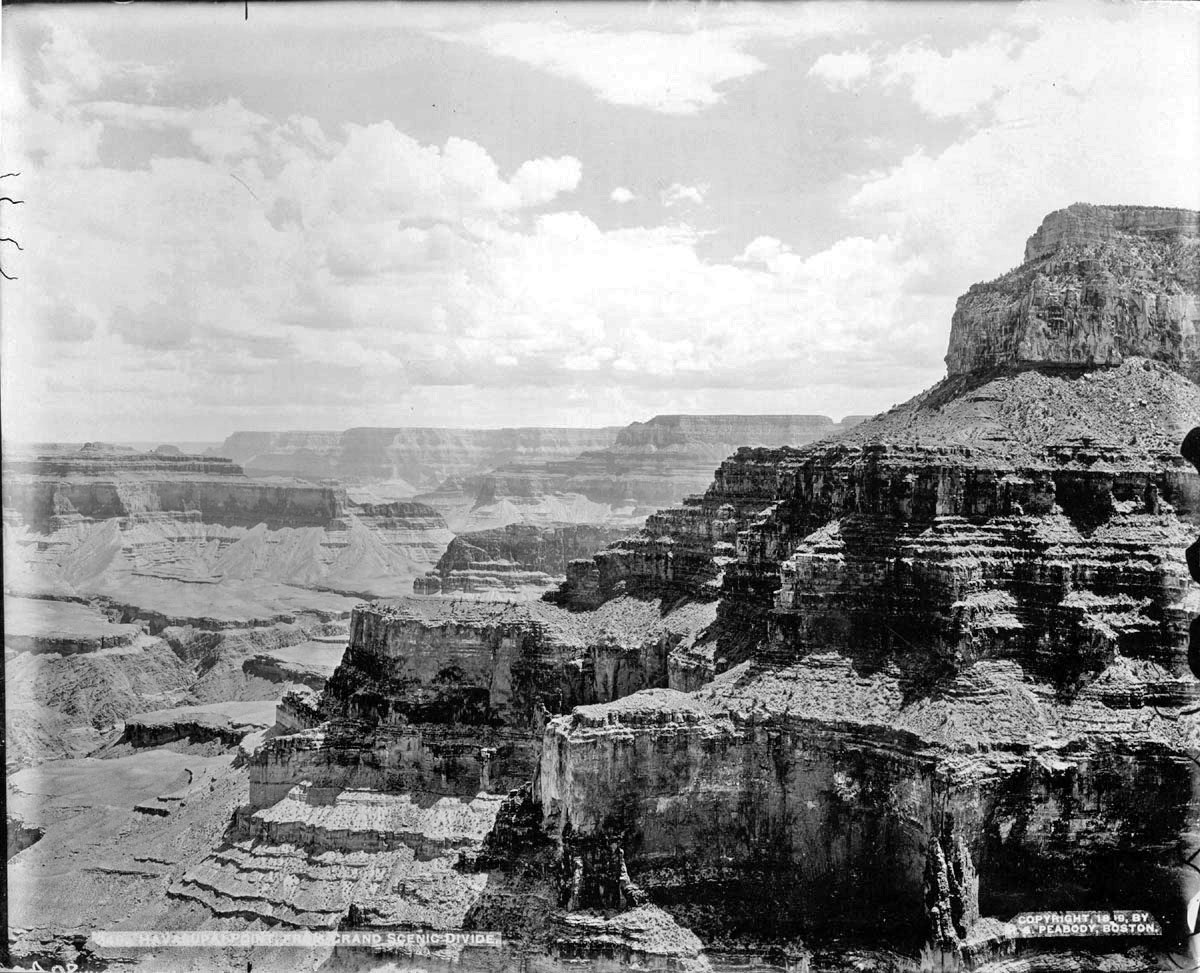
- (Havasupai Point, adjacent to Fossil Mountain)

Highest point
- Elevation: 6,729 ft (2,051 m)
- Prominence: 309 ft (94 m)
- Isolation: 0.61 mi (0.98 km)
- Coordinates: 36°11′26″N 112°21′39″W

Geography
- Location within Arizona Location within the United States
- Location: Grand Canyon National Park; Coconino County, Arizona, US
- Parent range: Coconino Plateau; Colorado Plateau
- Topo map: USGS Explorers Monument

Geology
- Mountain type(s): sedimentary rock: limestone, sandstone, siltstone, mudstone, shale
- Rock types: the most common top 4 rock units in Grand Canyon-(relatively large thicknesses as in most of West Grand Canyon) and Kaibab Limestone-(prominence cliff), Toroweap Formation, Coconino Sandstone-(massive basement-cliff), Hermit Formation-(shale)

Fossil Mountain is a prominence that is located on a spur in the Western Grand Canyon, in Coconino County, Arizona. The summit of this prominence has an elevation of 6,729 ft (2,051 m) and lies about 1 mi (1.6 km) southeast of the Grand Scenic Divide, and 1 mi (1.6 km) west of Havasupai Point. This summit lies almost level with the surface of the adjacent tableland of the South Rim, the forested Kaibab Plateau.

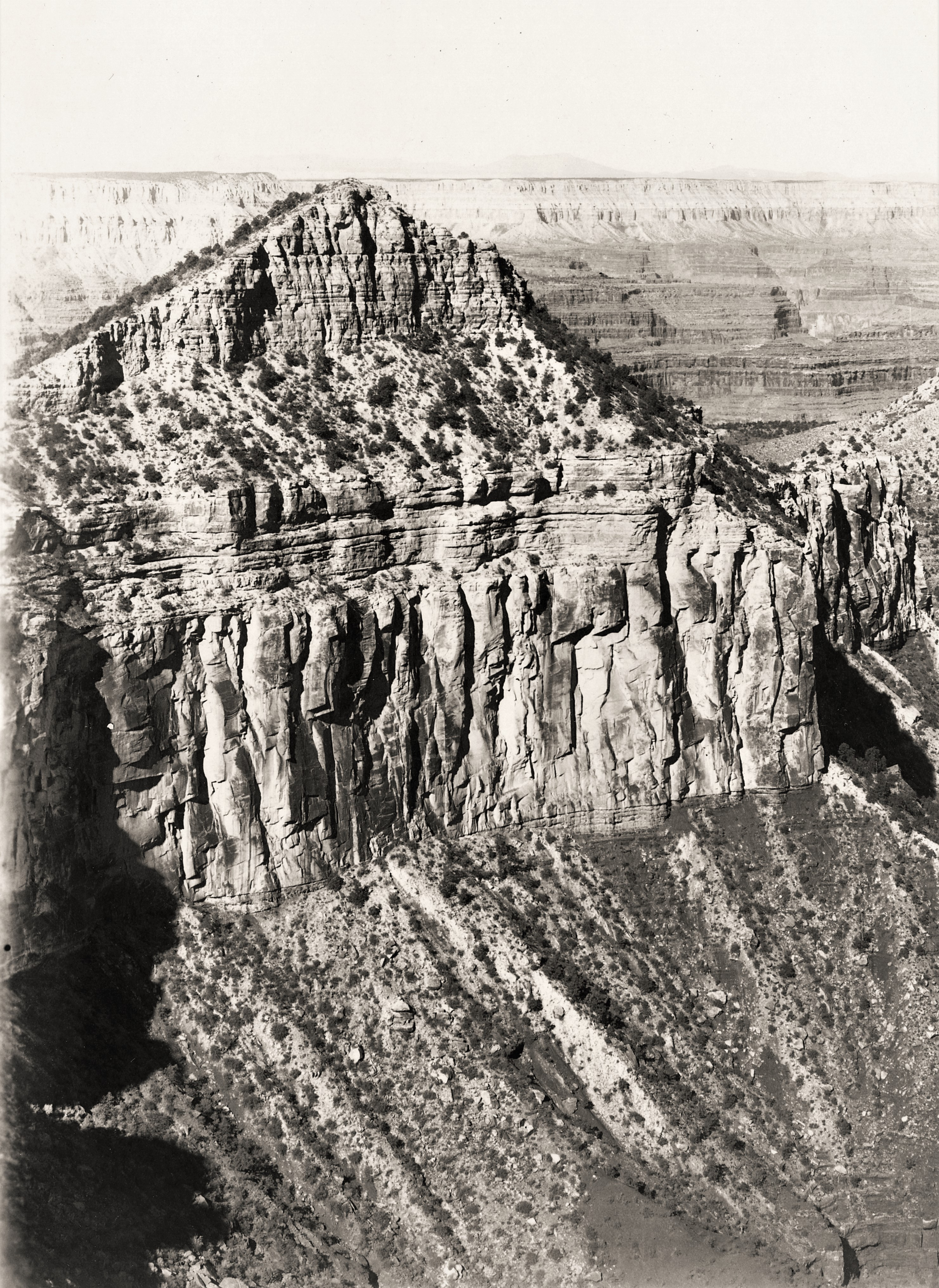
East aspect of Fossil Mountain in 1901

As seen in the above photograph, Fossil Mountain exhibits a large cliff of Kaibab Limestone. The southwest slope of Fossil Mountain is a highly vegetated (trees), and high angle slope to the prominence. Below the 350 ft (110 m) cliff of Kaibab Limestone is about ~250 ft (76 m) of vegetated slope-forming Toroweap Formation. The Toroweap Formation sits upon a ~500 ft (150 m) cliff-forming, Coconino Sandstone, very vertical, and uneroded, (northeast face of Fossil Mountain, overlooking the canyon). The Coconino Sandstone sits on large slopes of vegetated Hermit Formation.

== Geology ==
At Fossil Mountain, The Kaibab Limestone consists of often fossiliferous, light-gray, thick-bedded, chert, cherty limestone and sandy limestone. It is 211.5 ft (64.5 m) thick and contains the abundant fossils of shallow marine organisms including brachiopods, bryozoans, sponges, and crinoids. The fossils found in the Kaibab Limestone at Fossil Mountain include Productus occidentalis, Composita sp., Avonia sp., Lophophyllum sp., Meekella sp., Pugnoides sp., Spiriferina sp., and Productus bassi. The fossils of crinoids typically consist of disarticulated columnals and plates

Fossil Mountain is the type section of the Fossil Mountain Member of the Kaibab Limestone. The geology and paleontology of Fossil Mountain was first described by E. D. McKee in 1938. Later, in 1962, J. E. Sorauf informally designated the lower, uniformly cherty limestones of the Kaibab Limestone, informally known as the β member, as the Fossil Mountain member. This name is based on the description of a measured section published by E. D. McKee in 1938 at Fossil Mountain and personal communications with him. Finally, in 1991, J. E. Sorauf and G. H. Billingsley formally named, in accordance with the rules of the North American Stratigraphic Code, the lower, uniformly cherty limestones of the Kaibab Limestone, as the Fossil Mountain Member with Fossil Mountain as its type location.
