= Powell Plateau (Arizona) =

Landform in northern Arizona

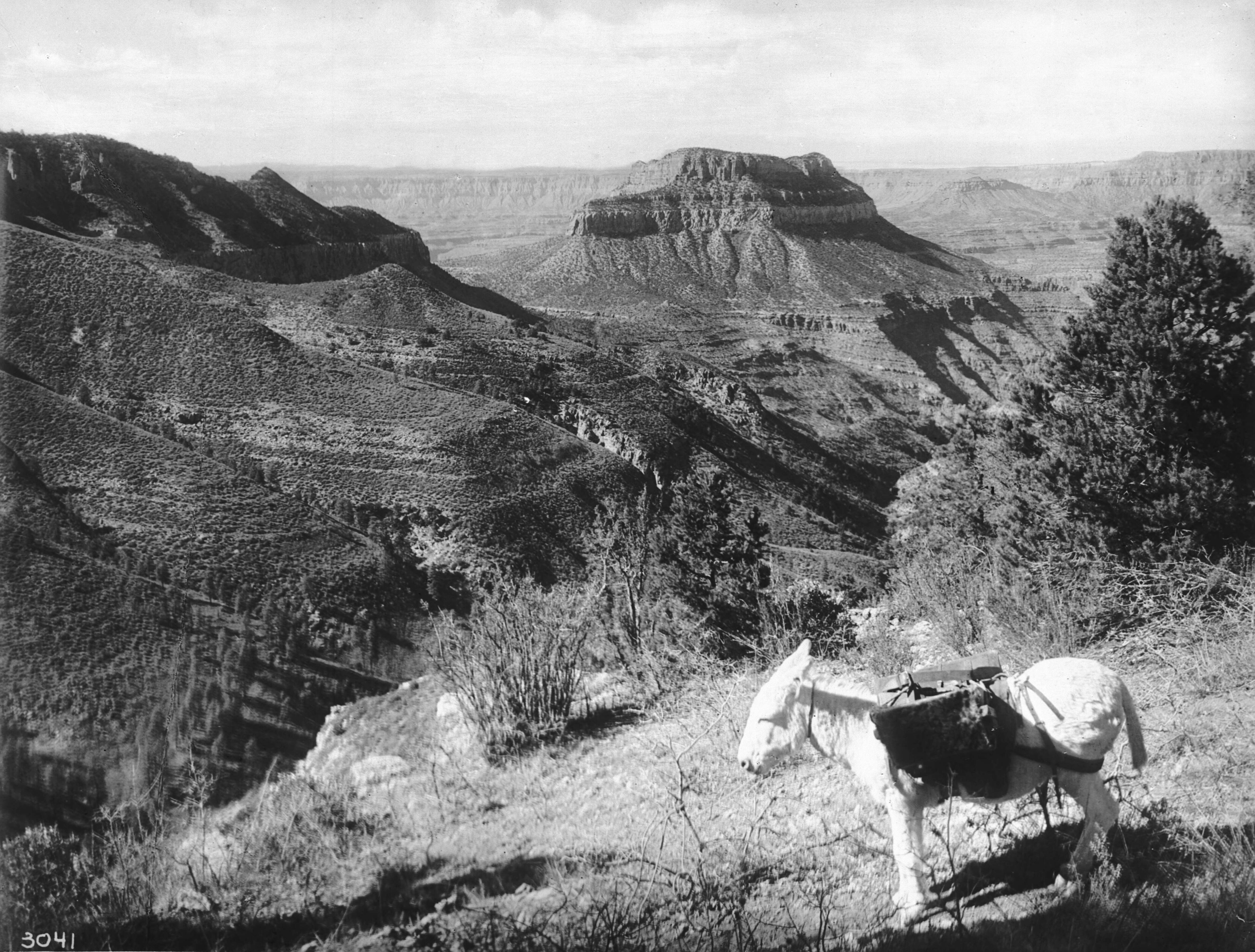
- (an area adjacent Powell Plateau) (Steamboat Mountain in the distance)

Highest point
- Elevation: 7,661 ft (2,335 m)
- Prominence: 961 ft (293 m)
- Parent peak: Kaibab Plateau (Swamp Point)
- Isolation: 3.0 mi (4.8 km)
- Coordinates: 36.3368°N 112.3726°W

Geography
- Location within Arizona Location within the United States
- Location: (West)-Grand Canyon; National Park; Coconino County, Arizona, US
- Parent range: Kaibab Plateau; Colorado Plateau
- Topo map: USGS King Arthur Castle

Geology
- Rock age: Permian
- Mountain type(s): sedimentary rock: limestone, siltstone, mudstone, sandstone, shale
- Rock type(s): Kaibab Limestone, Toroweap Formation, Coconino Sandstone, Hermit Shale, Supai Group, Redwall Limestone, Muav Limestone, Bright Angel Shale

Powell Plateau, named for geologist and explorer John Wesley Powell, is a 7,661-foot-elevation plateau-summit located in western Grand Canyon, about 13 mi northwest of Grand Canyon Village in Coconino County of northern Arizona, USA. Being a large plateau. (~300 acres, 0.47 mi^{2}), the plateau causes a large west-northeast-north excursion of the west-flowing Colorado River, caused by the southwest arm of the plateau. There is a slightly-southeast trending arm, and the main plateau then trends north to higher elevations.

The east side of Powell Plateau is drained by White Creek (Muav Canyon), and is traversed by the North Bass Trail. The high point prominence is at the plateau's north terminus, opposite Swamp Point, (North Rim). The high point at the southeast arm's terminus adjacent Dutton Point is 7,538 ft. The high point of the southwest arm is 6,883 ft.

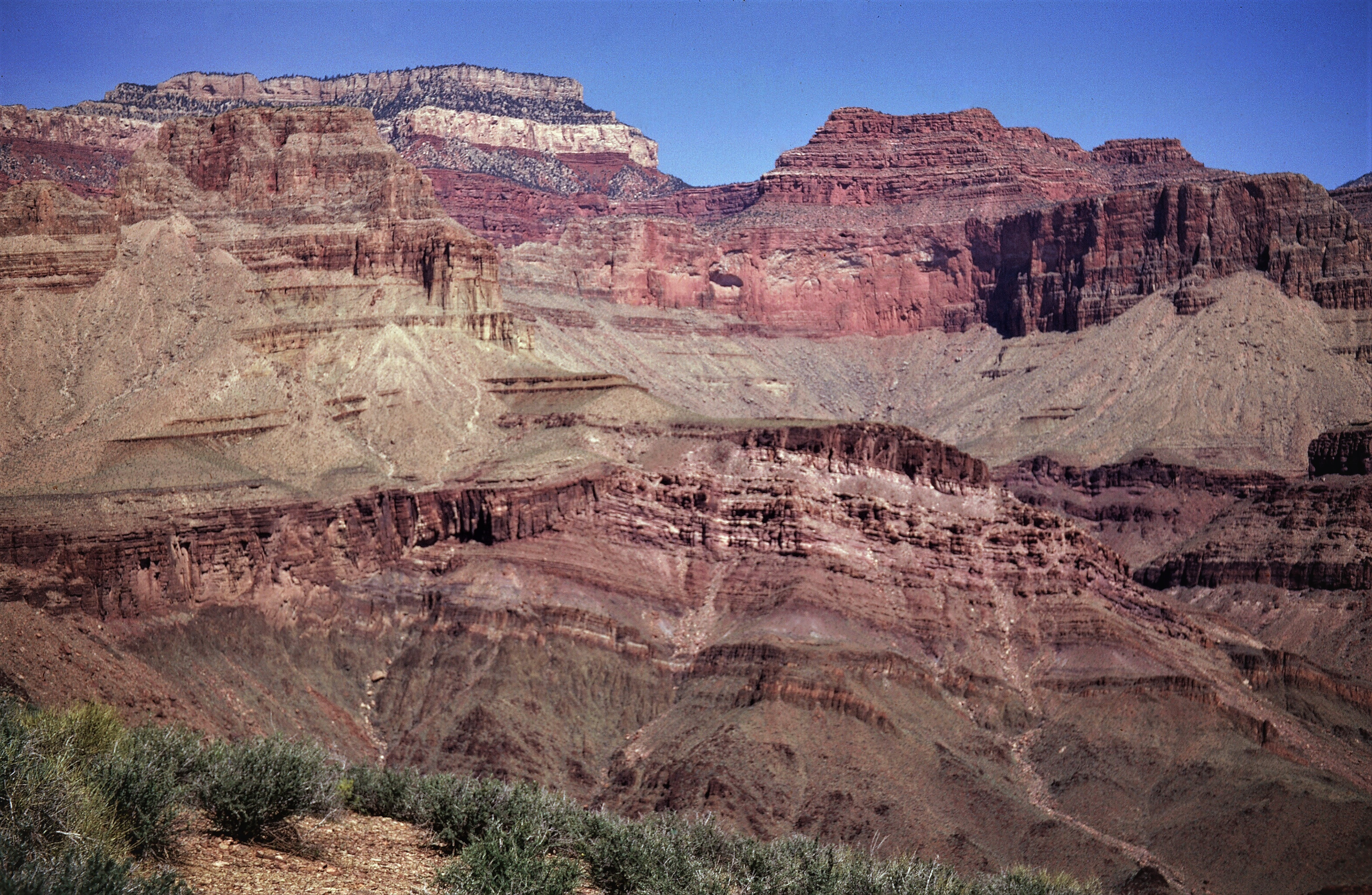
Dutton Point of Powell Plateau (upper left)

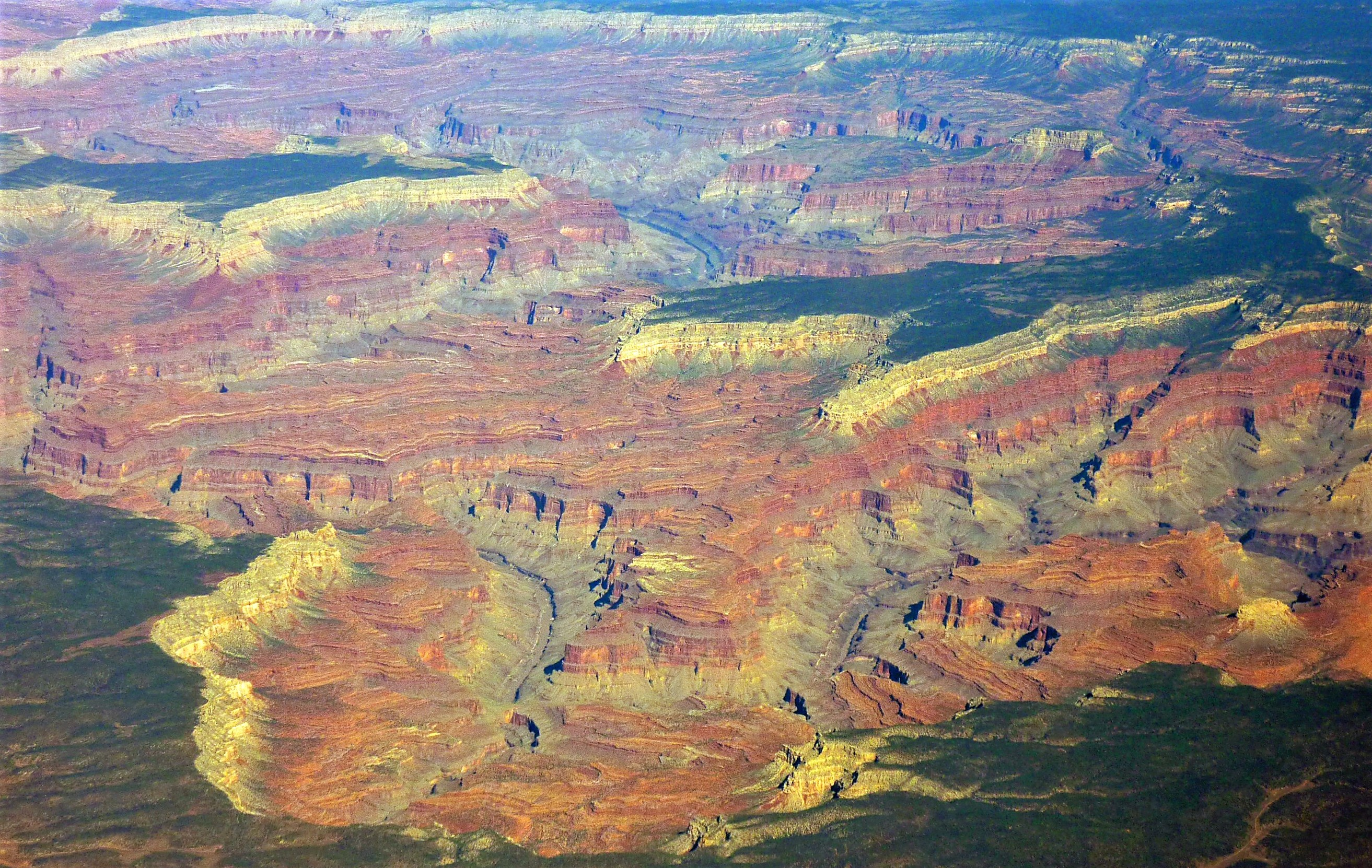
Powell Plateau (right), Great Thumb Mesa (left), aerial from airliner
