= Explorers Monument (Grand Canyon) =

Landform in the Grand Canyon, Arizona

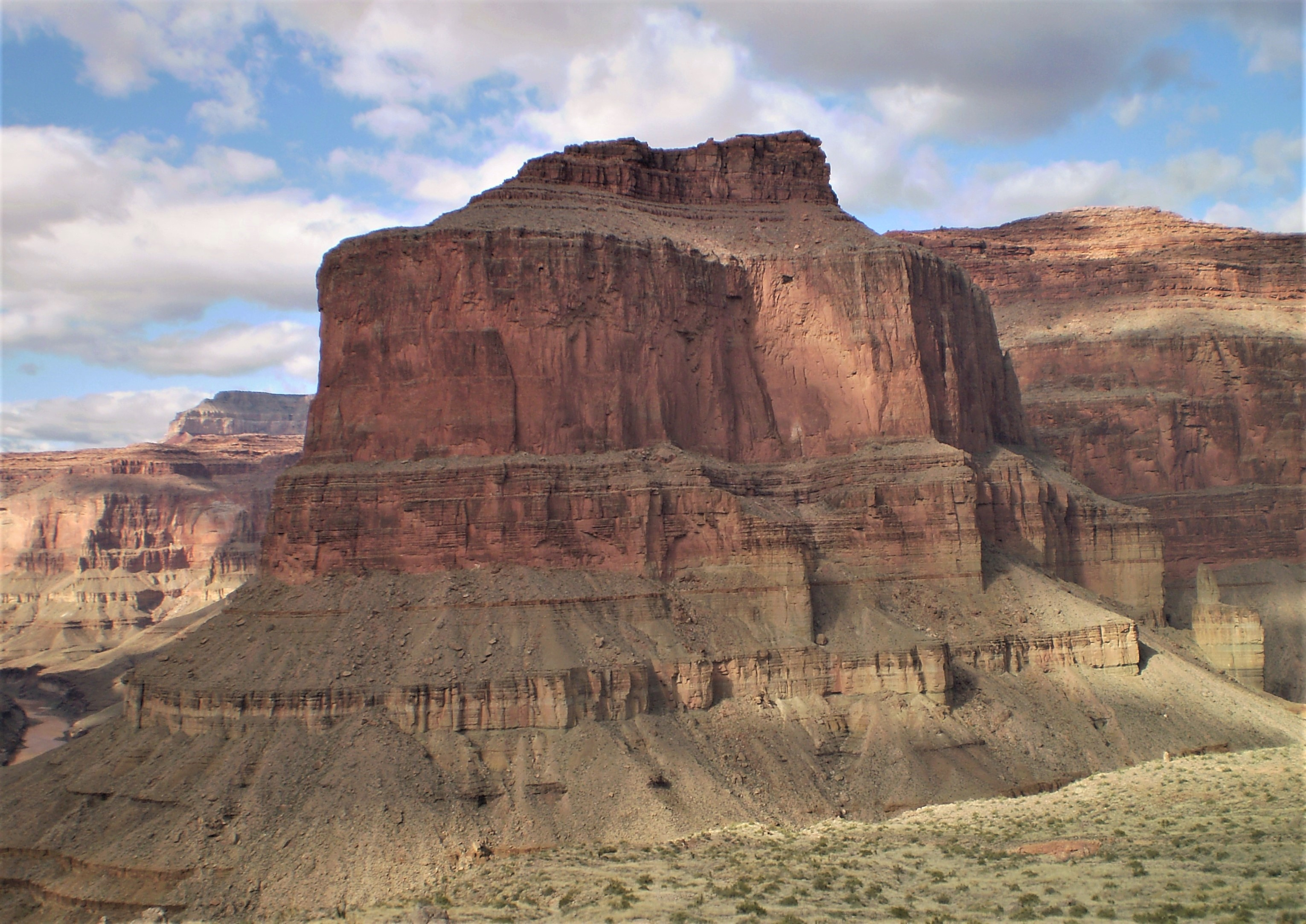
- Southwest aspect

Highest point
- Elevation: 4,572 ft (1,394 m)
- Prominence: 272 ft (83 m)
- Parent peak: Marcos Terrace (5,140 ft)
- Isolation: 2.06 mi (3.32 km)
- Coordinates: 36°12′17″N 112°26′42″W

Geography
- Location within Arizona Location within the United States
- Country: United States
- State: Arizona
- County: Coconino
- Protected area: Grand Canyon National Park
- Parent range: Colorado Plateau
- Topo map: USGS Explorers Monument

Geology
- Rock type(s): sandstone, limestone, mudstone

Climbing
- Easiest route: class 4 climbing

Explorers Monument is a 4,572-foot-elevation (1,394-meter) summit located in the Grand Canyon, in Coconino County of northern Arizona, US. It is situated 3.5 miles due west of Mount Huethawali, within a meander of the Colorado River. It towers over 2,400 feet (730 meters) directly above the river, providing rafters a view of this landmark. Explorers Monument is topped by rock of the Pennsylvanian-Permian Supai Group which overlays cliff-forming Mississippian Redwall Limestone, which in turn overlays Cambrian Tonto Group. According to the Köppen climate classification system, Explorers Monument is located in a cold semi-arid climate zone.

== History ==
Explorers Monument was originally named "Marcos Monument" by George Wharton James because it adjoins Marcos Terrace, which is named for Marcos de Niza, a Franciscan friar and explorer. Subsequently, the United States Geological Survey proposed and in 1908 officially adopted the name "Explorers Monument" to honor Grand Canyon explorers Joseph Christmas Ives, George Wheeler, Edward Beale, Almon Thompson, and John Newberry.

== See also ==
- Geology of the Grand Canyon area
- History of the Grand Canyon area

== Gallery ==
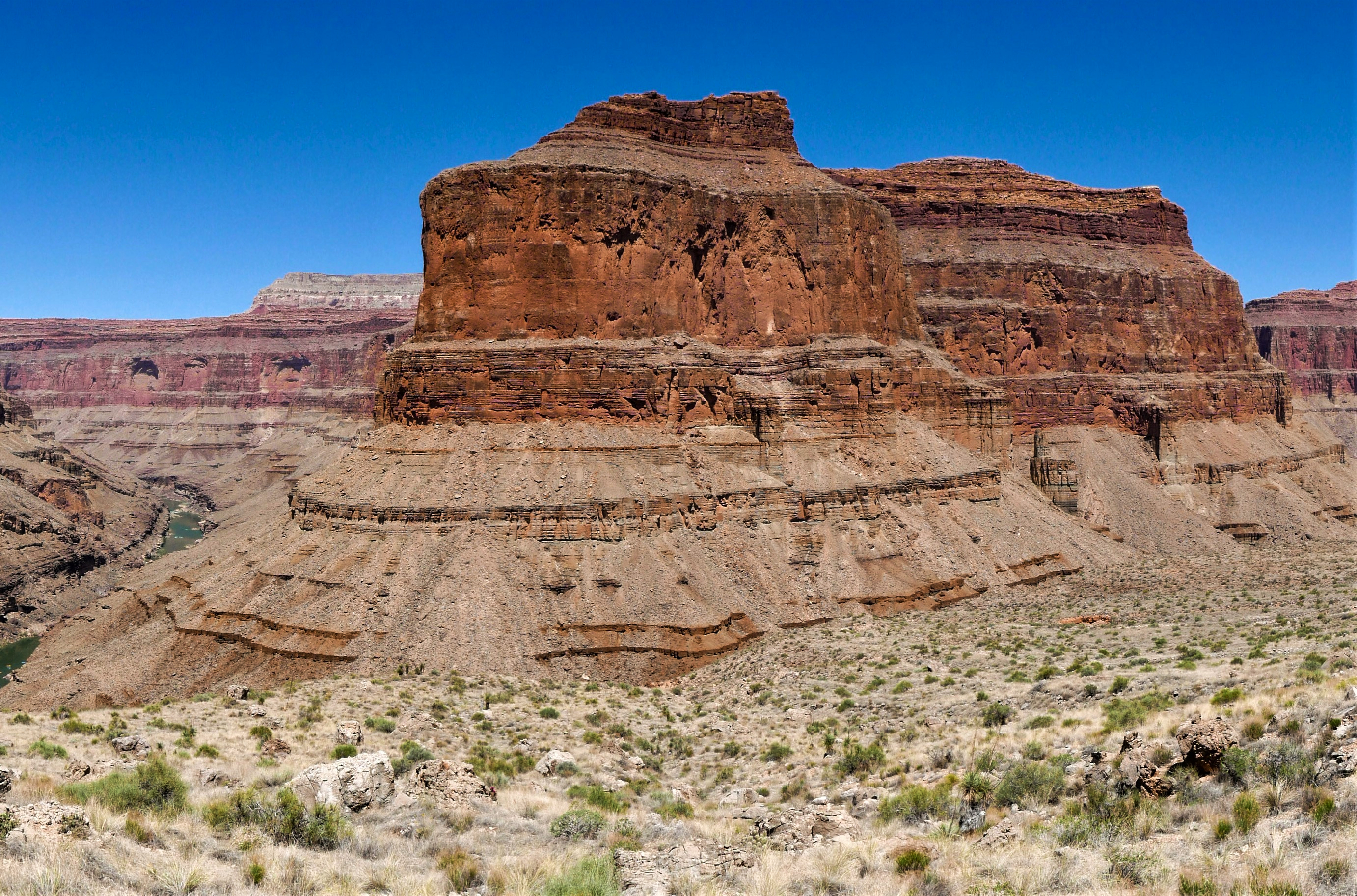

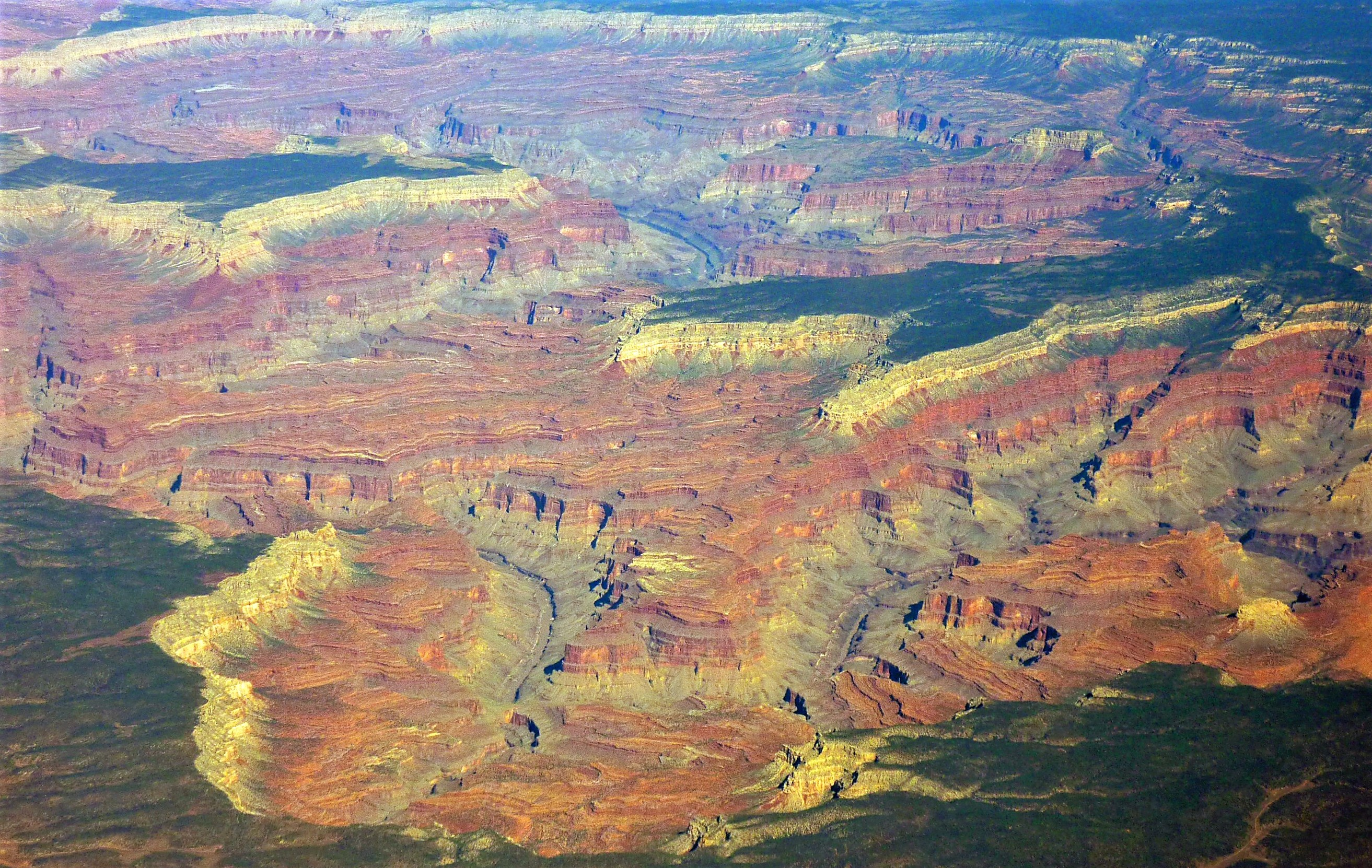
Explorers Monument centered near bottom within meander. From airliner.

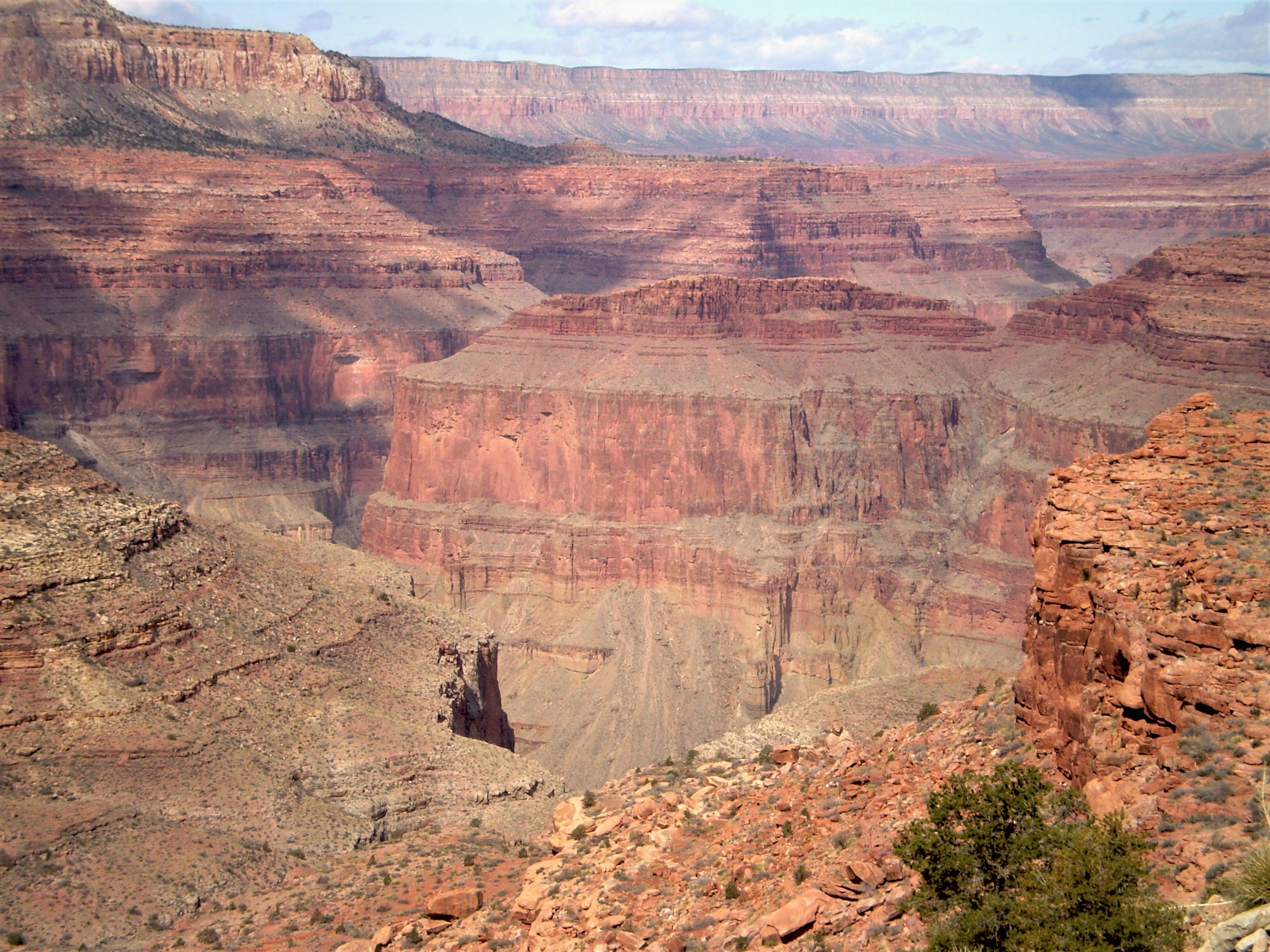
