= Grand Scenic Divide =

Landform in the Grand Canyon, Arizona

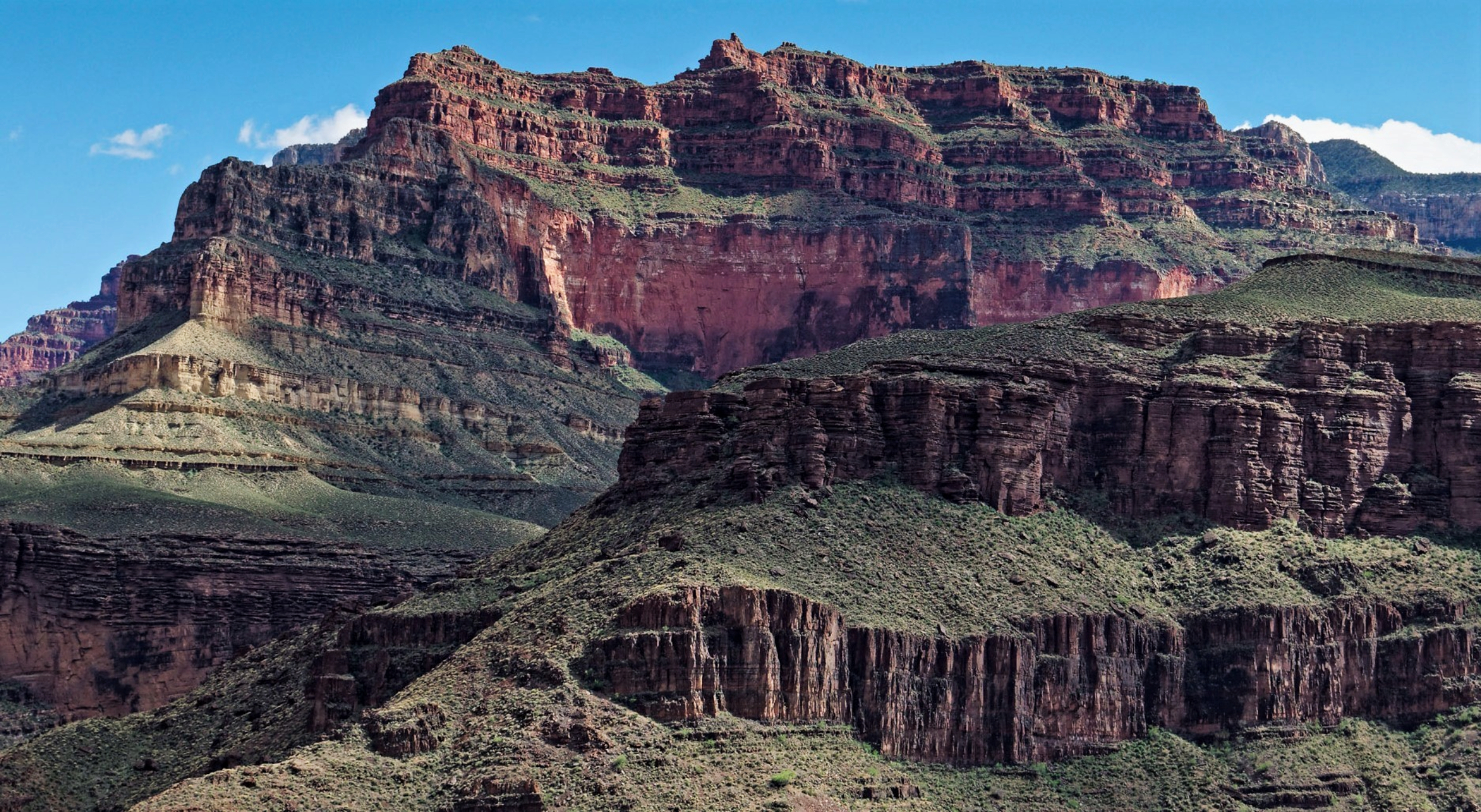
- North aspect

Highest point
- Elevation: 5,667 ft (1,727 m)
- Prominence: 87 ft (27 m)
- Parent peak: Fossil Mountain (6,729 ft)
- Isolation: 1.04 mi (1.67 km)
- Coordinates: 36°12′18″N 112°21′24″W

Geography
- Location within Arizona Location within the United States
- Country: United States
- State: Arizona
- County: Coconino
- Protected area: Grand Canyon National Park
- Parent range: Coconino Plateau; Colorado Plateau
- Topo map: USGS Havasupai Point

Geology
- Rock type(s): sandstone, limestone, shale

Climbing
- Easiest route: class 2 hiking

Grand Scenic Divide is a 5,667-foot-elevation (1,727-meter) ridge located in the Grand Canyon, in Coconino County of northern Arizona, Southwestern United States. It is situated immediately north of Fossil Mountain, and 1.5 mile east of Mount Huethawali. Surrounded by Bass and Serpentine Canyons, topographic relief is significant as it rises over 3,400 feet (1,000 meters) above the nearby Colorado River in 1.5 mile. It is composed of strata of the Pennsylvanian-Permian Supai Group. Further down are strata of the cliff-forming Mississippian Redwall Limestone, and Cambrian Tonto Group. According to the Köppen climate classification system, Grand Scenic Divide is located in a cold semi-arid climate zone. The normal approach to the ridge is made via the South Bass Trail, and from the top the view includes Masonic Temple, Holy Grail Temple, Dox Castle, King Arthur Castle, Evans Butte, Sagittarius Ridge, and Scorpion Ridge.

== Etymology ==
The Grand Scenic Divide is so named because it is here where the Grand Canyon markedly changes in geologic and scenic character. To the east are the isolated towers, buttes, temples, and side canyons which are the essence of its visual appeal, and to the west an absence of such striking scenery. This natural line of demarcation also happens to be where the granite of the inner gorge disappears, such that buttes did not form once the river flowed only through the sedimentary rocks. This geographical feature's name was applied by William Wallace Bass, and later officially adopted in 1932 by the U.S. Board on Geographic Names.

== Dick Pillar ==
Dick Pillar is a red sandstone pinnacle at the northeast tip of Grand Scenic Divide. It is unofficially named after Scottish geologist Robert Dick, whose work contributed to the progress of understanding Grand Canyon rock.

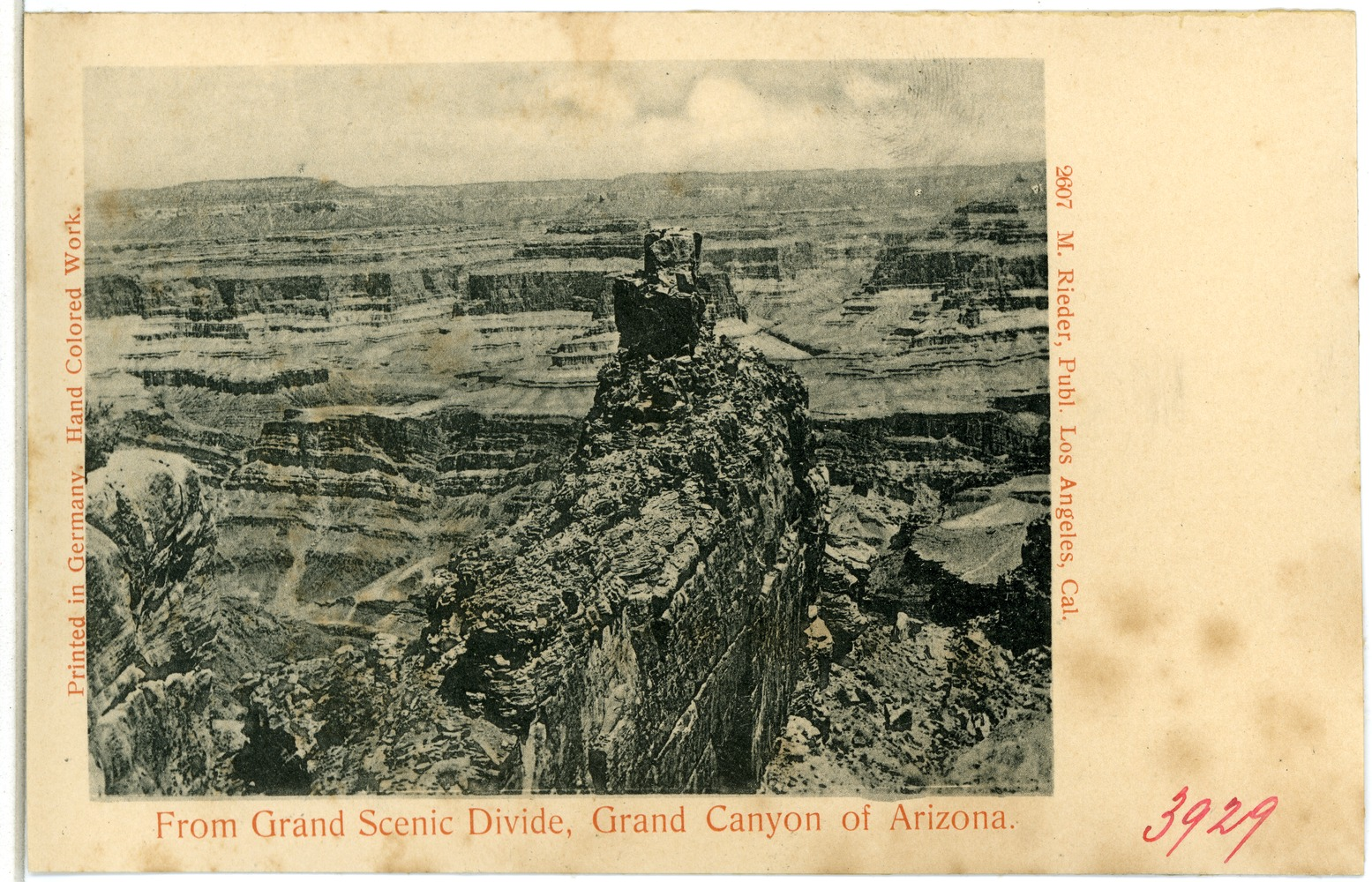
1903 postcard of Dick Pillar seen from Grand Scenic Divide

== See also ==
- Geology of the Grand Canyon area
- History of the Grand Canyon area
