= Tuna Creek =

Tuna Creek may refer to:

- Tuna Canyon, in Arizona, a component of the Grand Canyon
- Tunas Creek, in Texas
- Tunungwant Creek, in Pennsylvania and New York, nicknamed Tuna Creek
