= Mencius Temple =

Landform in the Grand Canyon, Arizona

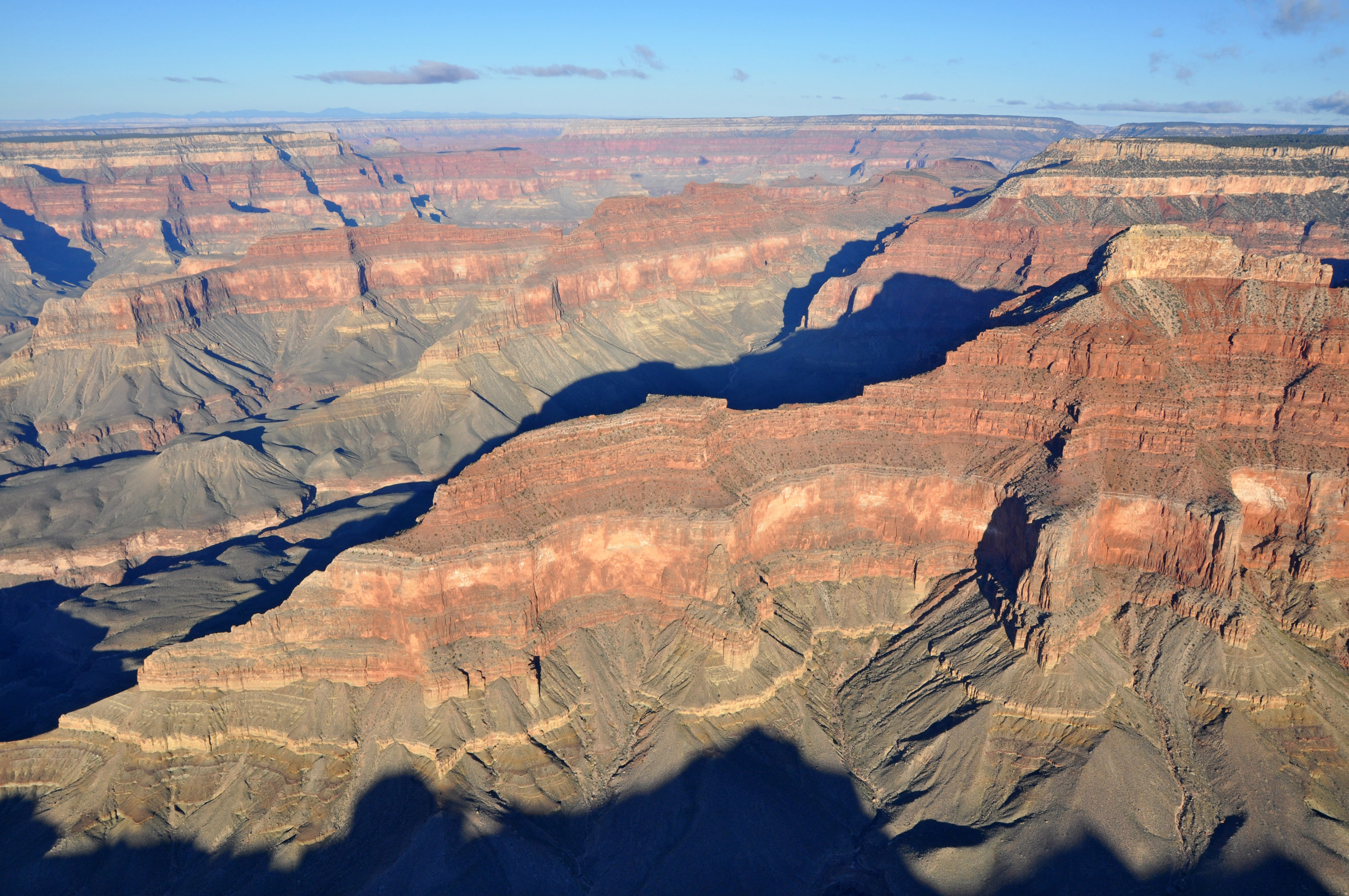

Highest point
- Elevation: 7,001 ft (2,134 m)
- Prominence: 461 ft (141 m)
- Parent peak: Confucius Temple
- Coordinates: 36°10′29″N 112°13′49″W

Naming
- Etymology: Mencius

Geography
- Location within Arizona
- Location: Grand Canyon; Coconino County, Arizona. U.S.
- Topo map: USGS Shiva Temple

Geology
- Mountain type: sedimentary
- Rock type(s): Kaibab Limestone-(prominence), Toroweap Formation, Hermit Formation, Supai Group, Redwall Limestone, (Tonto Group- 3-units) _3-Muav Limestone, _2-Bright Angel Shale, _1-Tapeats Sandstone, Vishnu Basement Rocks, (Metamorphic Rocks)

Mencius Temple, (former alternate name, Twin Buttes South) is a 7,001 ft major butte, part of the twin buttes of Confucius and Mencius Temples, near the beginning of Western Grand Canyon. Mencius Temple is south of Confucius Temple (0.56 mi), with a long ridge (Supai Group “redbeds”), projecting southwards to the north side of Granite Gorge, on the Colorado River. The buttes are below Point Sublime (~2.0 mi), and borders the west flank of the long Crystal Creek (Arizona) drainage. Tuna Creek (from Point Sublime), draining southwards, borders the west of the twin peaks.
