= Confucius Temple (Grand Canyon) =

Landform in the Grand Canyon, Arizona

- Twin Butte
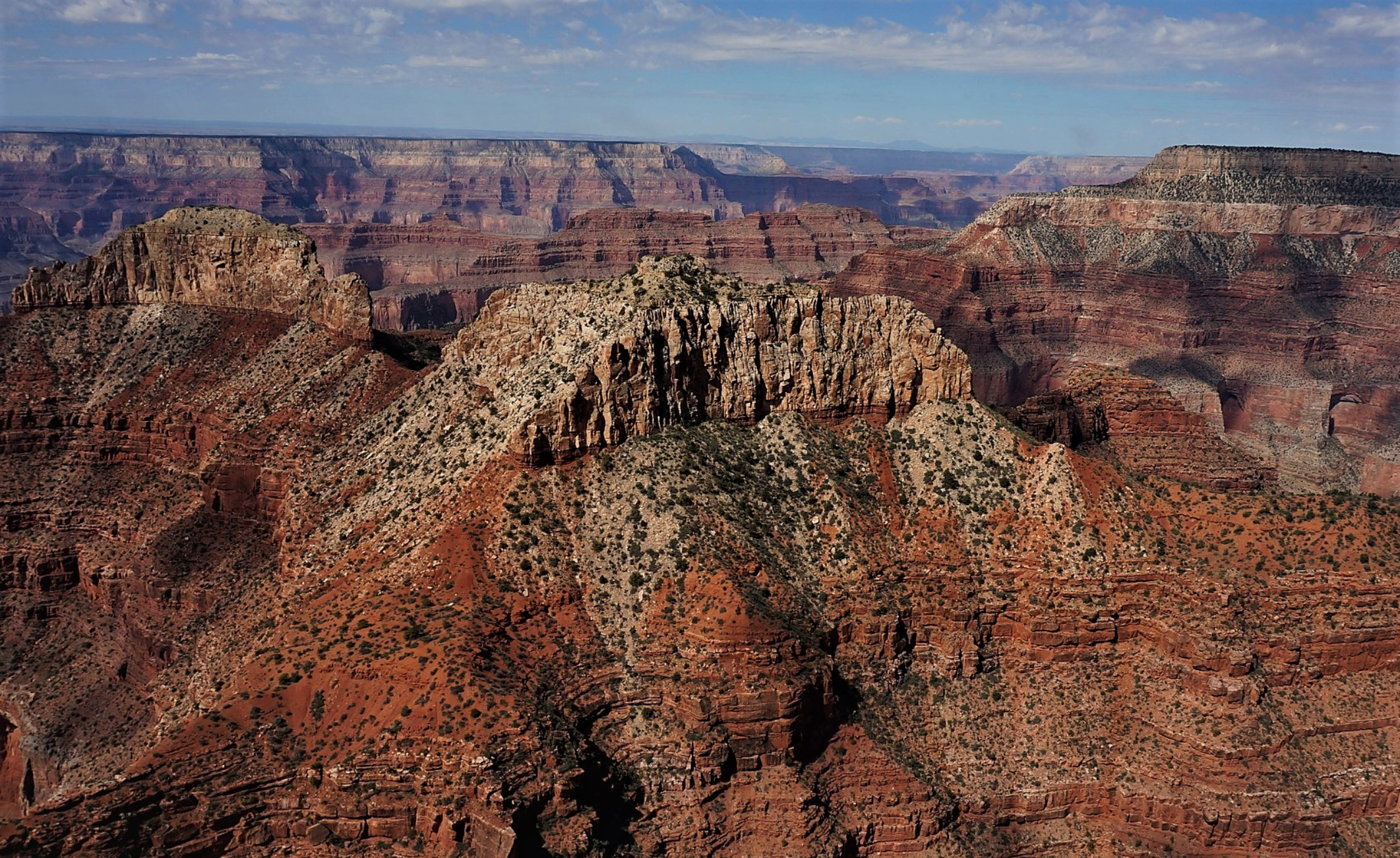
- East aspect, aerial view

Highest point
- Elevation: 7,081 ft (2,158 m)
- Prominence: 935 ft (285 m)
- Parent peak: Dragon Head (7,765 ft)
- Isolation: 2.64 mi (4.25 km)
- Coordinates: 36°10′49″N 112°13′18″W

Geography
- Location within Arizona Location within the United States
- Country: United States
- State: Arizona
- County: Coconino
- Protected area: Grand Canyon National Park
- Parent range: Kaibab Plateau; Colorado Plateau
- Topo map: USGS Shiva Temple

Geology
- Rock type(s): limestone, sandstone, mudstone

Confucius Temple is a 7,081-foot-elevation (2,158-meter) summit located in the Grand Canyon, in Coconino County of northern Arizona, US. It is situated 1.5 mile southeast of Point Sublime, four miles west-northwest of Shiva Temple, and three miles northwest of Tower of Ra, where it rises over 3,200 feet (980 meters) above Hindu Amphitheater. Confucius Temple is named for Confucius (551–479 BC), the Chinese philosopher. This name was applied by Clarence Dutton, who began the tradition of naming geographical features in the Grand Canyon after mythological deities. Confucius Temple is one of the Twin Buttes in the Grand Canyon, the other being Mencius Temple (7,001 ft), which is named for Mencius, considered the second-most famous sage, after only Confucius himself. This mountain's name was officially adopted in 1906 by the U.S. Board on Geographic Names. According to the Köppen climate classification system, Confucius Temple has a Cold semi-arid climate.

== Geology ==
The top cupola of Confucius Temple is composed of the basal layer of Permian Kaibab Limestone, upon a similar-thickness unit of slope-forming Toroweap Formation, overlaying cream-colored, cliff-forming, Permian Coconino Sandstone. The sandstone, which is the third-youngest of the strata in the Grand Canyon, was deposited 265 million years ago as sand dunes. Below the Coconino Sandstone is reddish, slope-forming, Permian Hermit Formation, which in turn overlays the Pennsylvanian-Permian Supai Group. Further down are strata of the conspicuous cliff-forming Mississippian Redwall Limestone, the Cambrian Tonto Group, and finally granite of the Paleoproterozoic Vishnu Basement Rocks at Colorado River level. Precipitation runoff from Confucius Temple drains west to Tuna Creek, and east to Crystal Creek, both north tributaries of the Colorado River.

== See also ==
- Geology of the Grand Canyon area

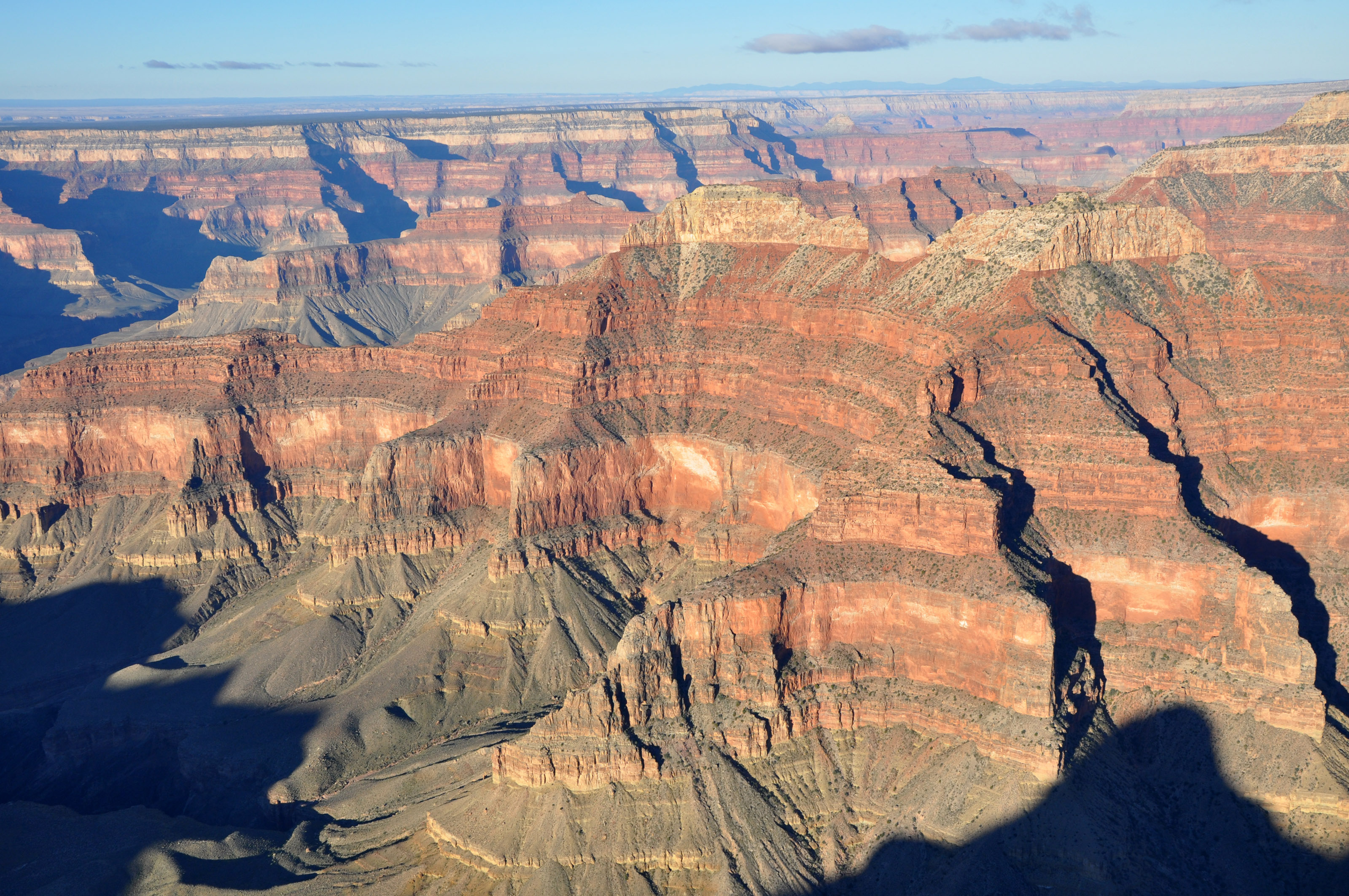
Aerial of Mencius and Confucius Temples, looking west
