= Tuna Canyon =

Landform in the Grand Canyon, Arizona

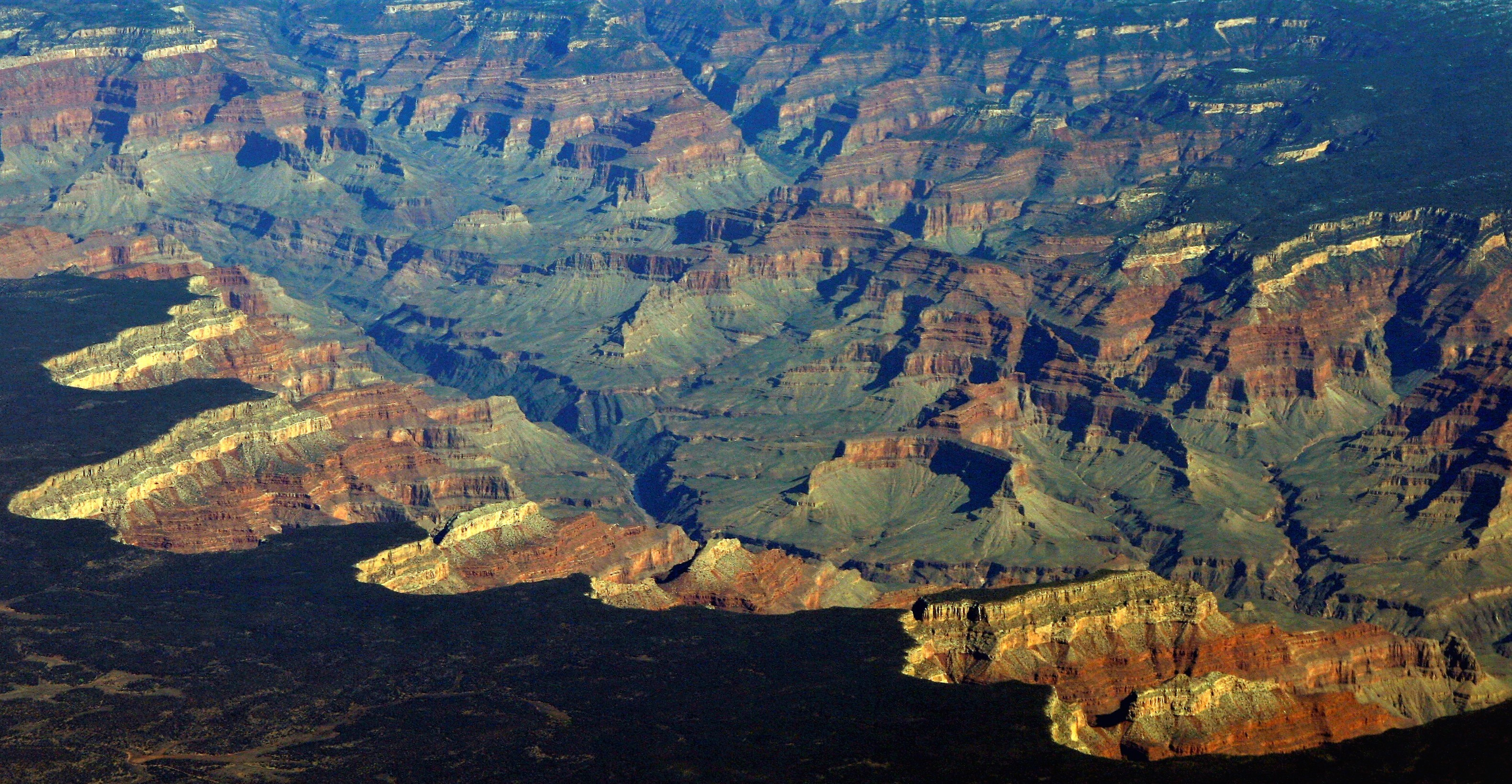
- Tuna Canyon (photo center (right border))

- Location within Arizona
- Floor elevation: 2,297 ft (700 m)
- Length: ~3.5 mi south-north, then northeast

Geology
- Age: Permian down to Cambrian (central Lower Canyon, gorge)-Proterozoic Vishnu Basement Rocks

Geography
- Location: (west)-Grand Canyon, (northern)-Arizona, United States
- Borders on: List: Mencius Temple; Confucius Temple; Sagittarius Ridge; Point Sublime; Grama Point
- Coordinates: 36°11′54″N 112°15′04″W
- Topo map: Havasupai Point, USGS
- Rivers: Tuna Creek
- Interactive map of Tuna Canyon

Tuna Canyon is a short, high-angle, descending, narrow canyon in western Grand Canyon, below the North Rim. It lies across Granite Gorge in a region of four canyons, and a fifth smaller canyon, as the Colorado River courses westward around the Point Sublime (elevation, 7,192 ft), (and Grama Point (elevation, 7,692 ft)), ridgelines. The high-angle of Tuna Canyon, Tuna Creek, creates the Tuna Creek Rapids (Rapid) at the outfall. Tuna Canyon is a short canyon, nestled between the ridges, but just east is the very long drainage of Crystal Creek (Arizona), which drains from the Kaibab Plateau. The Crystal Rapid is adjacent upstream from the Tuna Creek Rapids.

Tuna Canyon lies about 1.5 miles northeast of the Scorpion Ridge landform on the Colorado River. Point Sublime is directly south up-canyon about 1.5 miles, and the headwater Grama Point, traverses up-canyon, northeast, about 2.0 miles from Point Sublime, the canyon total length being more than 3.0 miles.

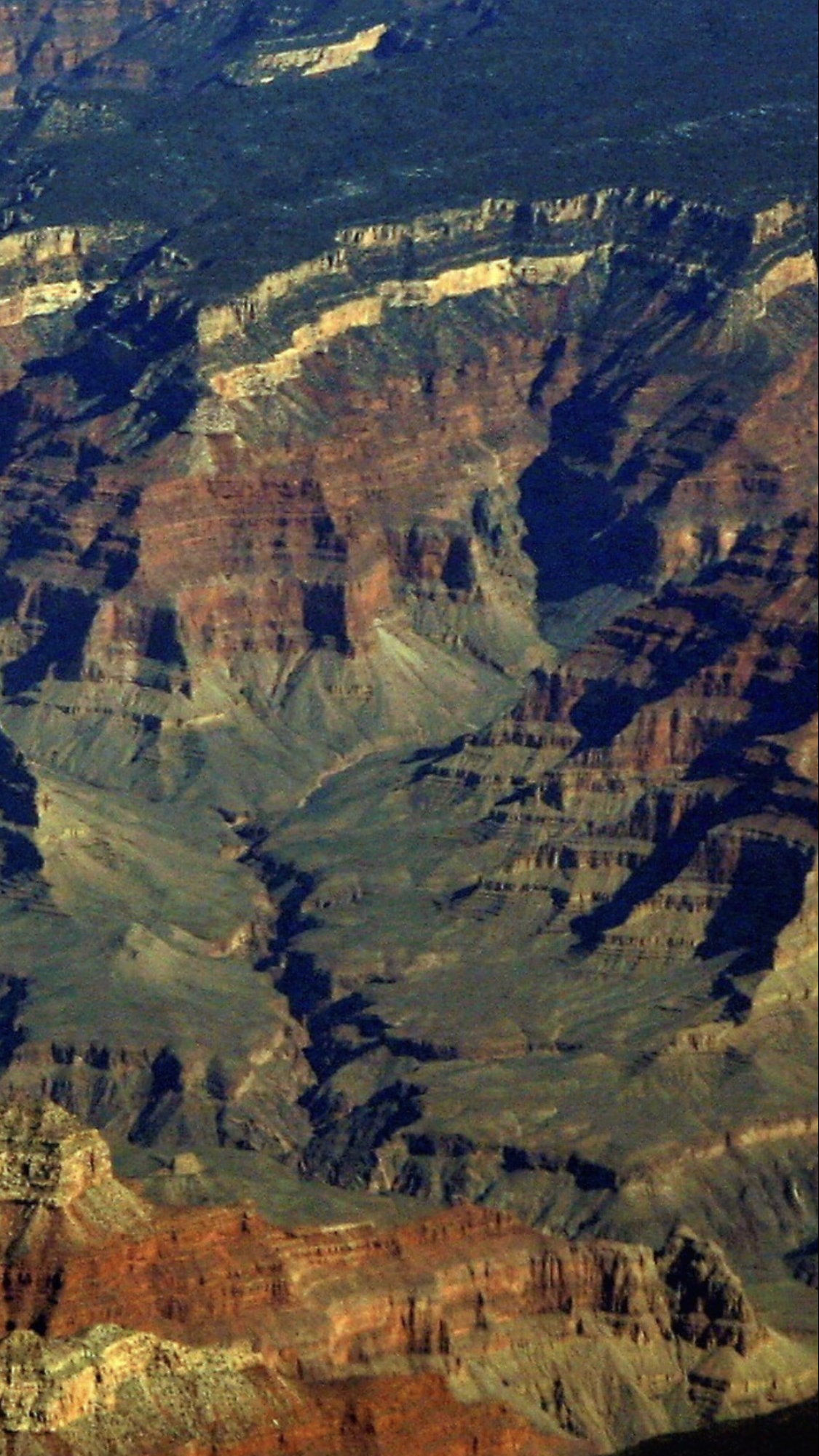
Tuna Canyon (lower canyon), lies directly below Point Sublime; the headwaters are northeast at Grama Point.

== Landforms ==
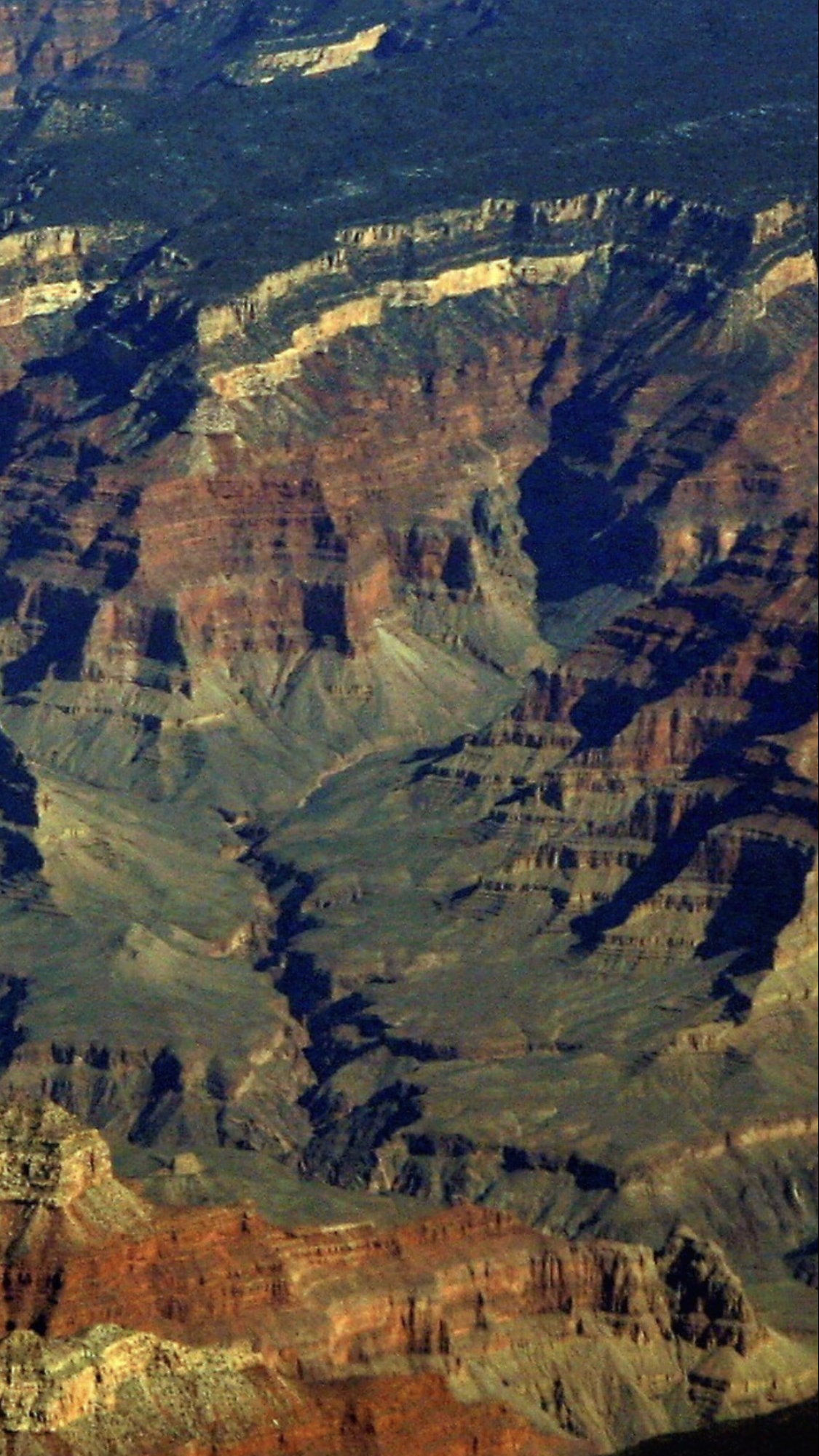
Tuna Canyon (lower canyon), lies directly below Point Sublime; the headwaters are northeast at Grama Point. (Grama Point not in photo)

Three major prominences and two scenic viewpoints border Tuna Canyon. The east flank is bordered by the massifs of Mencius Temple (South Tuna Canyon), connected to Confucius Temple, northeast, and connected north with Grama Point, (Northeast Tuna Canyon).(Grama Point also overlooks South Crystal Canyon, the extensive north tributary of the a Colorado River, to the east.) Across the north of Tuna Canyon, lies Point Sublime, west, and two points, east, Grama Point the most eastward, and a headwater drainage.

The west border of Tuna Canyon, goes up a drainage at the west of Point Sublime, and the short tributary drainage is at the southeast of the extensive Sagittarius Ridge; Scorpion Ridge is attached southwest, but the west border of South Tuna Canyon, is separated from Scorpion Ridge by a short unnamed drainage, the east ridgeline being the west border of South Tuna Canyon.

== Tuna Creek Rapids ==
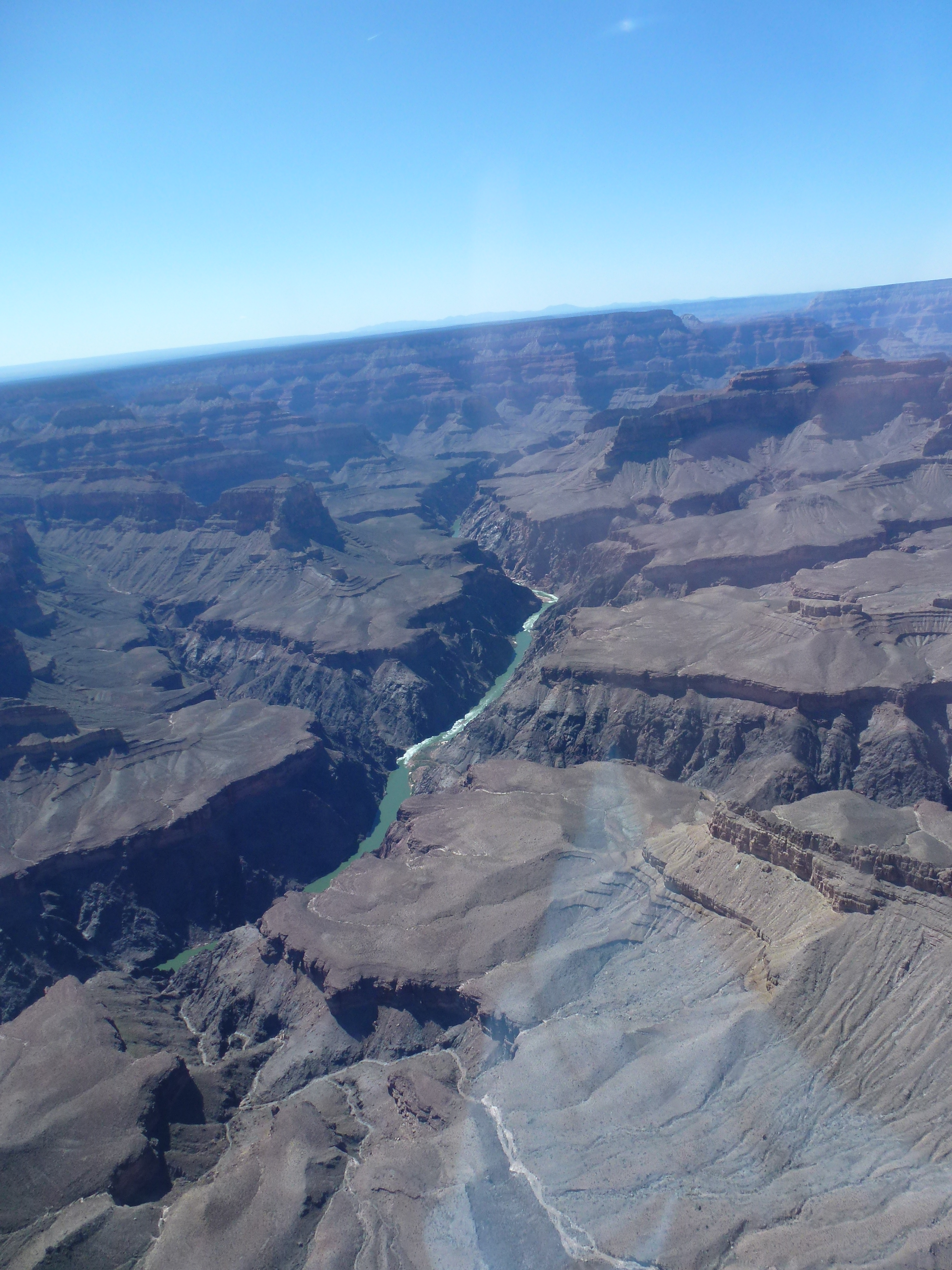
(View: west, downstream) Upstream, Crystal Rapid, downstream, (smaller)-Tuna Creek Rapids

The Tuna Creek Rapids are at Colorado River Mile 99; Crystal Rapid, is at Mile 98.

== Geology-Valley floor and Cliffs ==
The Tuna Canyon, valley floor has a gentler sloping geology, from the dramatic cliffs, of the points to the north, and the massifs of Mencius and Confucius Temples at the east and northeast.

Cliff-former rock units are also platform-formers with the dramatic example in the Grand Canyon of the Redwall Limestone; it is actually a gray limestone, but the red-orange Supai Group above, stains it red. The upper platform of the Redwall is omnipresent in the canyon, supporting numerous named landforms. Interestingly the Redwall Limestone also sits on a short cliff-section of the Muav Limestone, (forming a platform); thus the Redwall-Muav Limestones are a double-platform unit.

The geology summarized of Tuna Canyon is as follows:

=== North cliffs section ===
- Permian
  - Kaibab Limestone-(~horizontal)-prominence, at Grama Point)
  - Toroweap Formation
  - Coconino Sandstone
  - Hermit Shale
- Cambrian-Pennsylvanian
- Supai Group
- Cambrian
  - Esplanade Sandstone-Supai Group, unit 4
- Pennsylvanian
  - Supai units: 3,2,1-Wescogame, Manakacha, Watahomigi
- Mississippian
  - Redwall Limestone
- (Cambrian)
  - Muav Limestone

=== Valley Floor and tributary Gorge ===
- Cambrian
  - Muav Limestone
  - Bright Angel Shale
  - Tapeats Sandstone
- Neoproterozoic
  - Vishnu Basement Rocks or Unkar Group, etc.

== Gallery ==
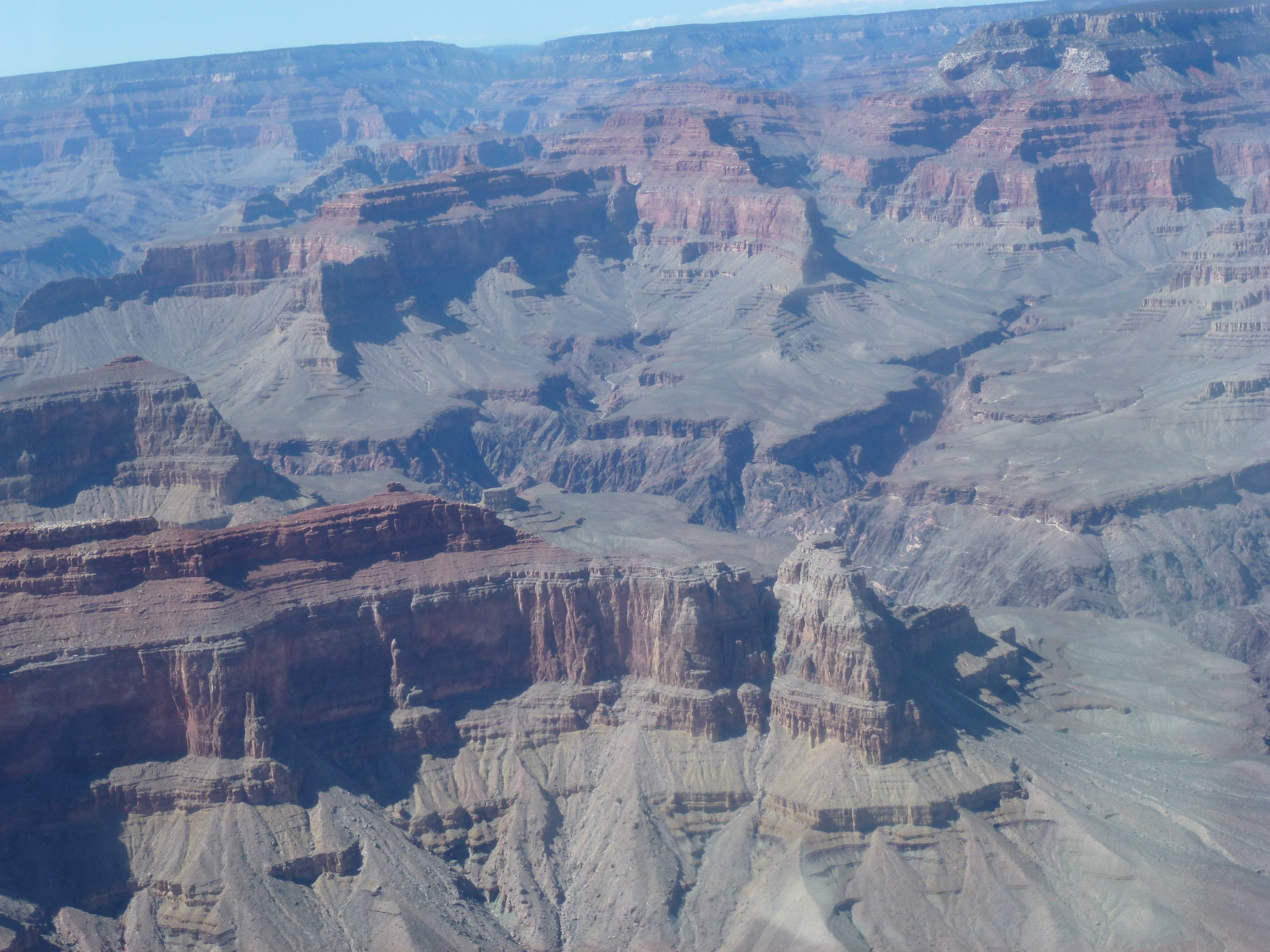
(south of Granite
Gorge)-Marsh Butte, and
Slate Canyon (lower canyon)
(north)-Scorpion Ridge,
Sagittarius Ridge,
Point Imperial, and
Tuna Canyon

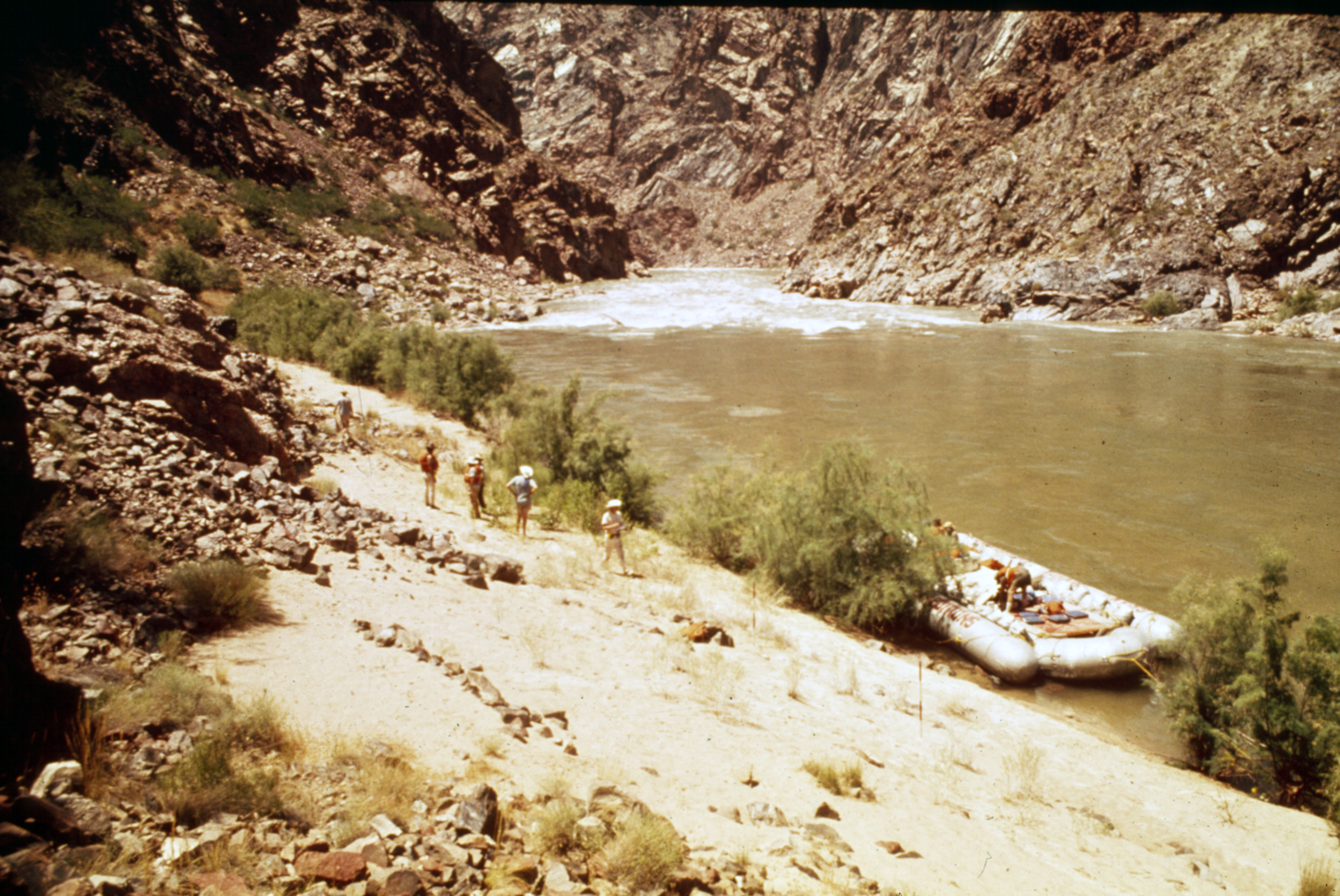
view down-river
Left bank
Mile 99.1

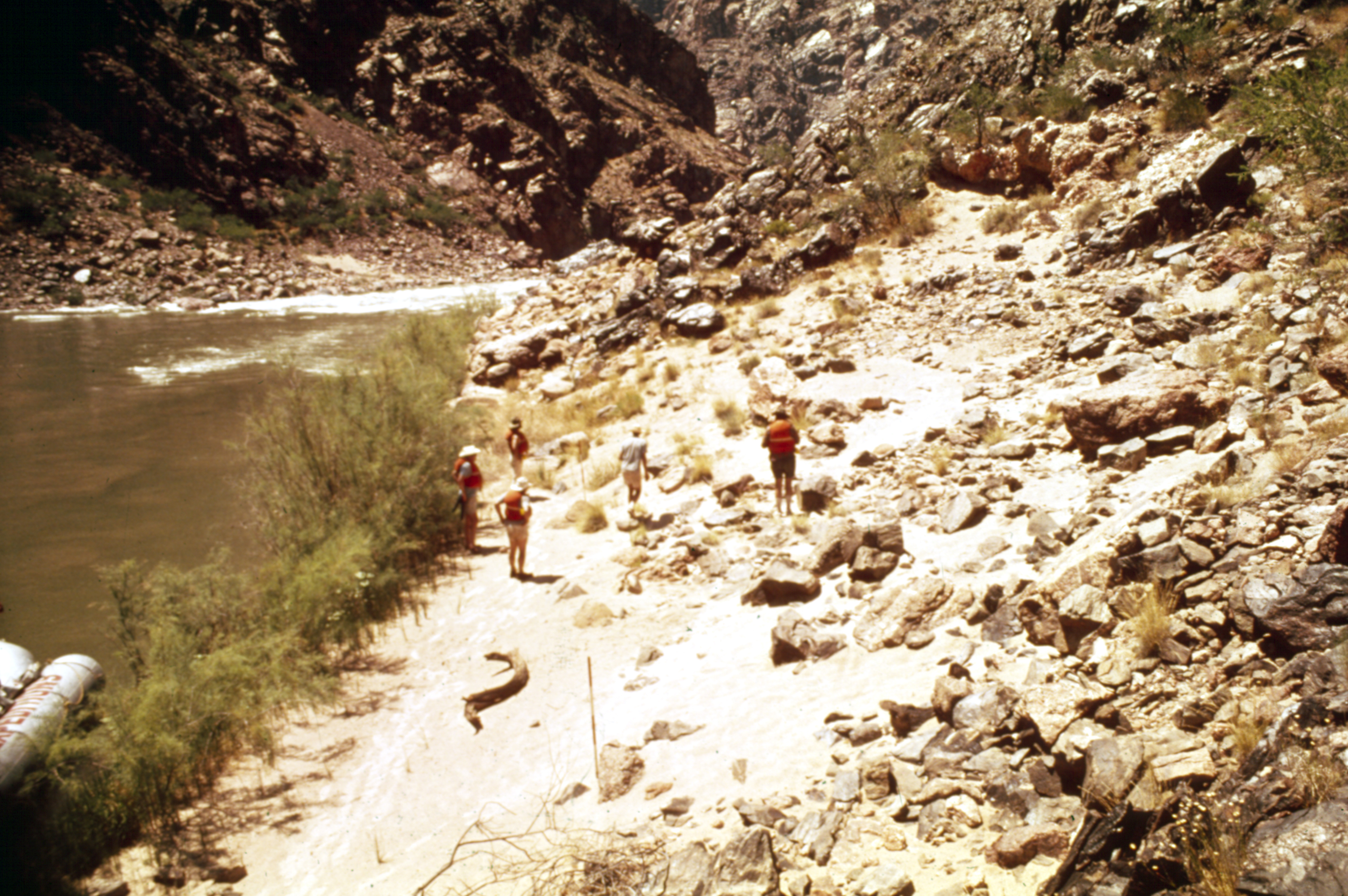
view down-river
Right Bank,
Tuna Creek
(Mile 99.1)
