= Dunn Butte =

Landform in the Grand Canyon, Arizona

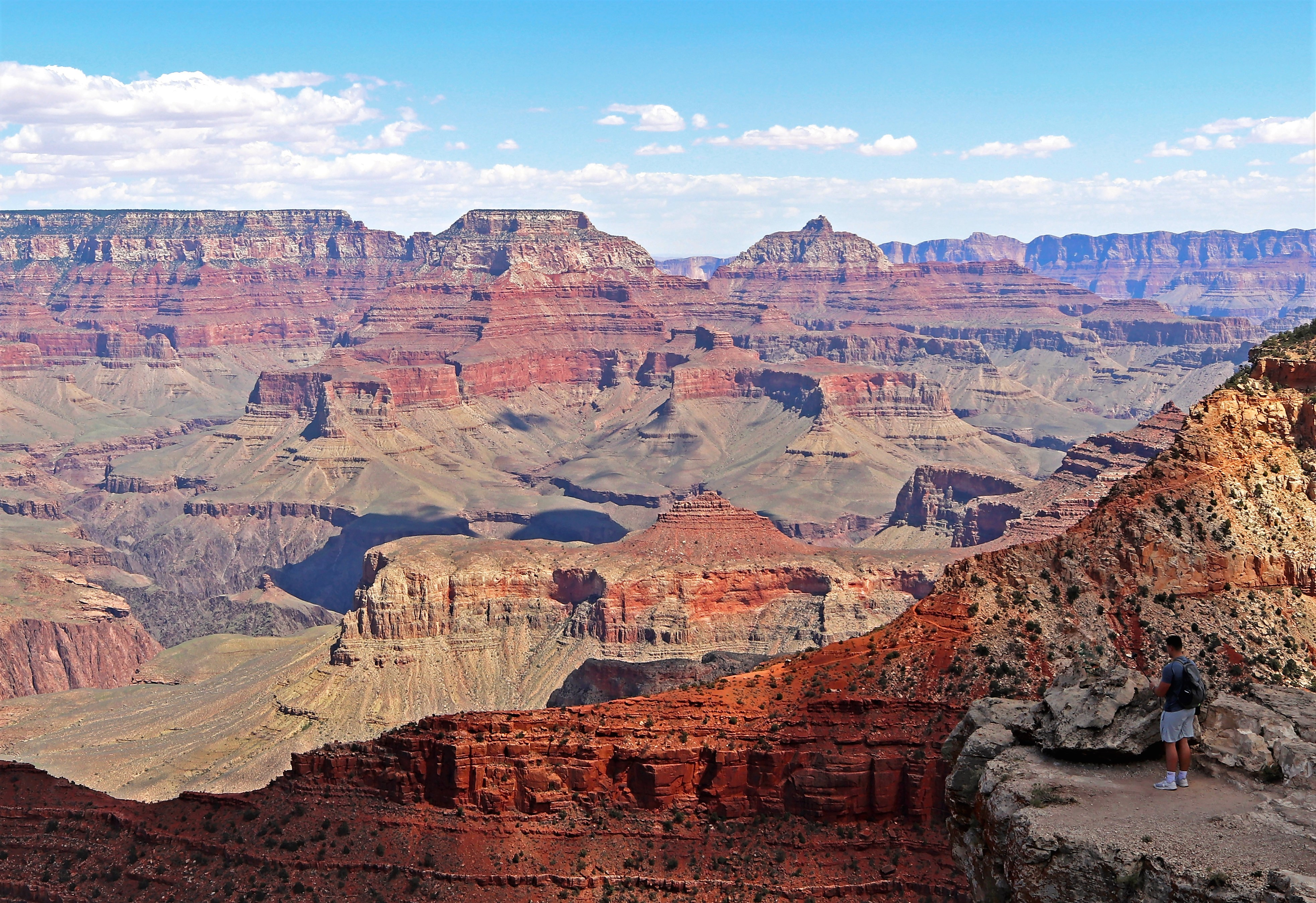
- Dunn Butte horizontal-ridgeline seen at southwest flank of Angels Gate

Highest point
- Elevation: 5,714 ft (1,742 m)
- Prominence: 450 ft (140 m)
- Parent peak: Angels Gate
- Isolation: ~0.75
- Coordinates: 36.0838724°N 111.9929432°W

Geography
- Location within Arizona
- Location: Grand Canyon; Coconino County, Arizona. U.S.
- Topo map: USGS Cape Royal

Geology
- Rock age: Permian-Pennsylvanian-(prominence) down to Cambrian
- Mountain type: sedimentary
- Rock types: (remainder shelf-(cliff)) of Manakacha Formation, on slopes of Watahomigi Formation, on platform of Redwall Limestone and Supai Group, Redwall Limestone, Temple Butte Formation; Tonto Group; 3 units: 3 – Muav Limestone, 2 – Bright Angel Shale, 1 –Tapeats Sandstone

Dunn Butte, is a 5,714 foot-elevation-summit, a minor butte, along a line of three summits along the west drainage of Ninetyone Mile Canyon and Creek. From higher elevation-to-lower, they are Angels Gate, Dunn Butte, and Hawkins Butte. The bases of all three landforms are connected, and Dunn Butte is a south-southwest ridgeline, with the high point prominence at the northeast terminus.

The massif of Wotans Throne is adjacent 1.0 mi northeast. The Cape Royal viewpoint is ~2.0 mi northeast; Dunn Butte is 2.0 north of the Colorado River, its drainage point.

== Geology ==
The prominence geology of Dunn Butte is based on the massifs of Supai Group upon the cliff-former, (and therefore platform-former), of Redwall Limestone. The Supai Group (and Redwall), massifs are also found on the parent (and connected landform), of Angels Gate, and neighboring butte northwest, Thor Temple.

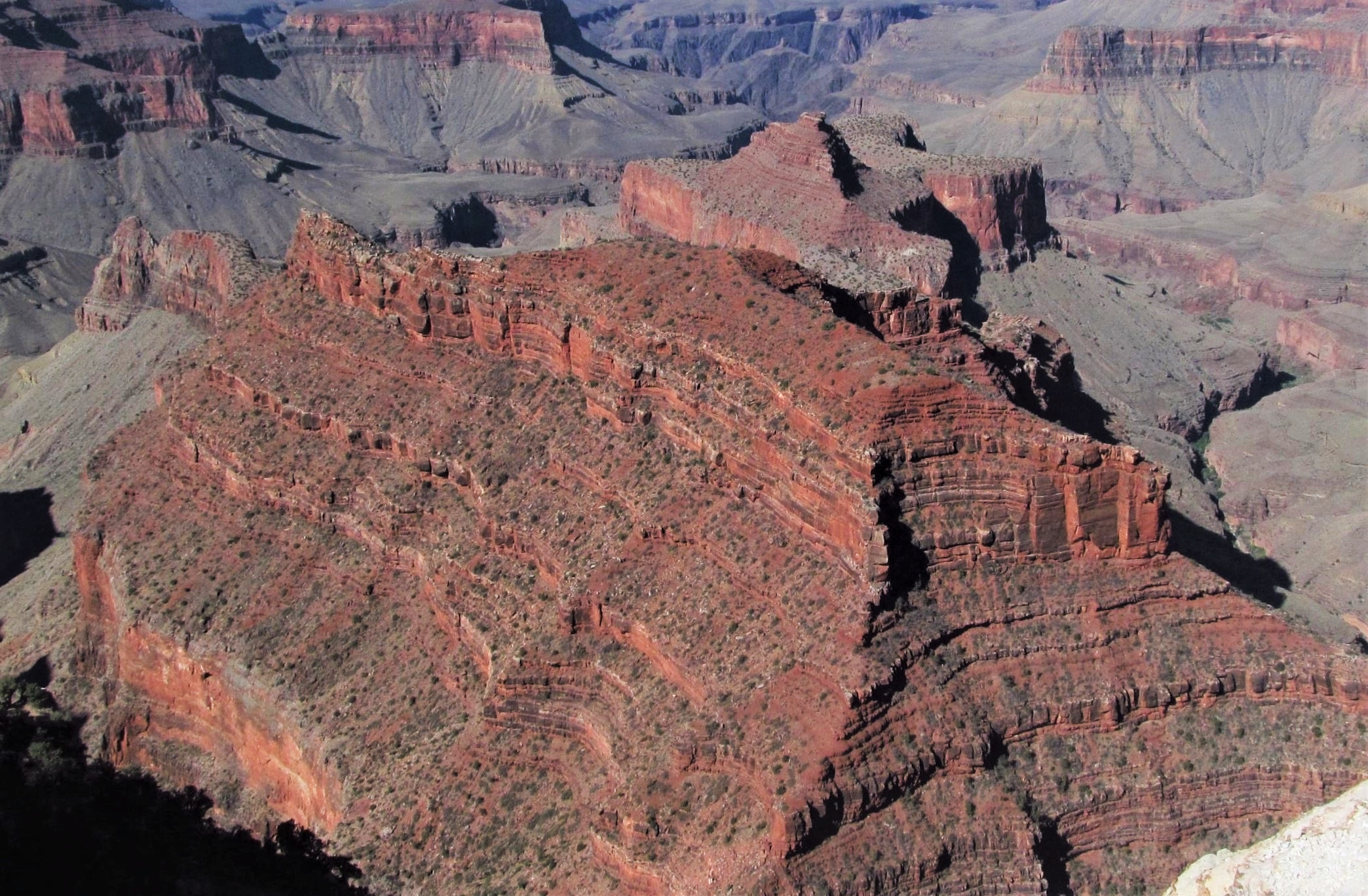
Thor Temple

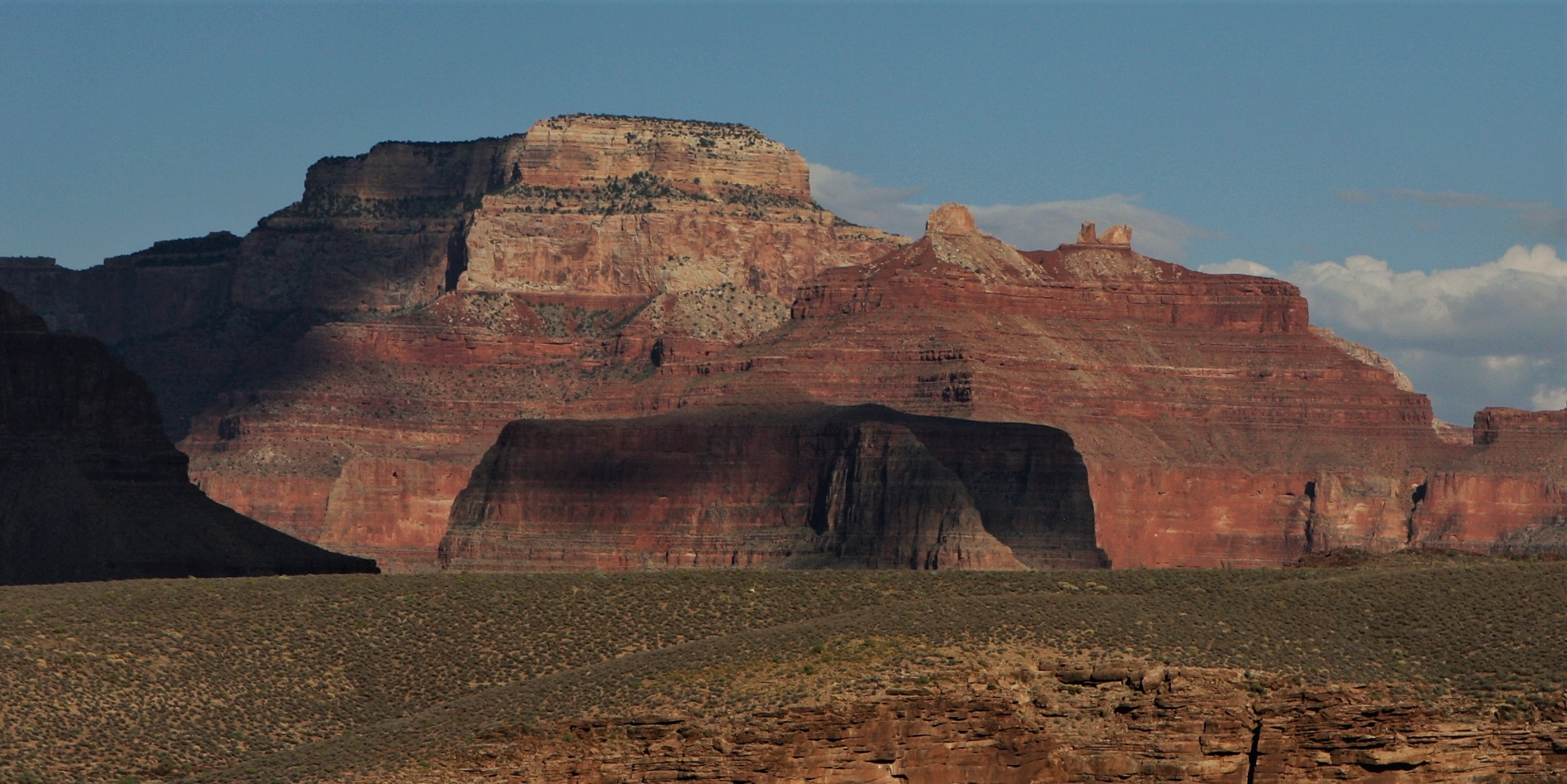
Angels Gate & Wotans Throne

=== Geology – Dunn Butte, Angels Gate, & Thor Temple ===
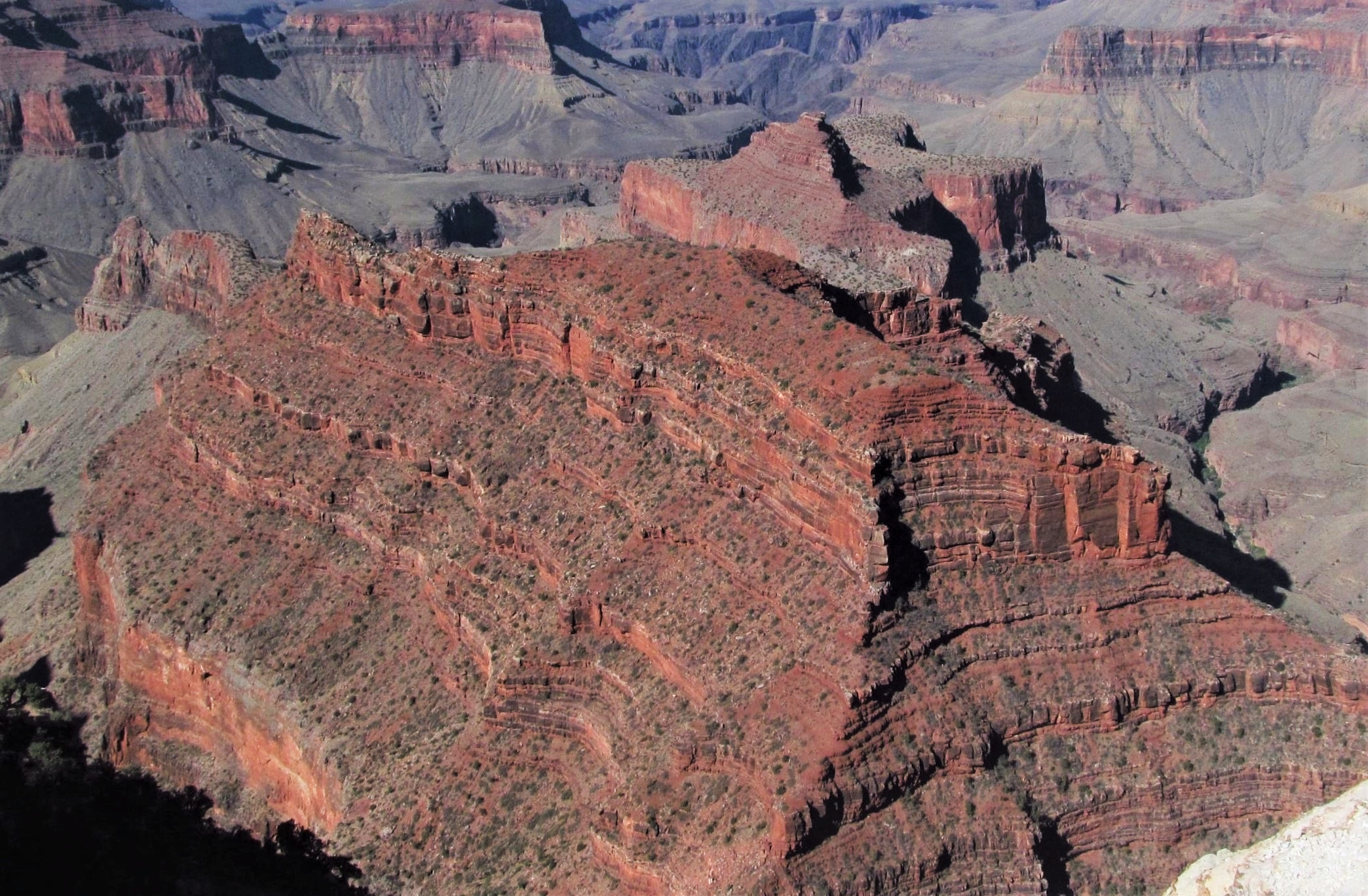
Thor Temple

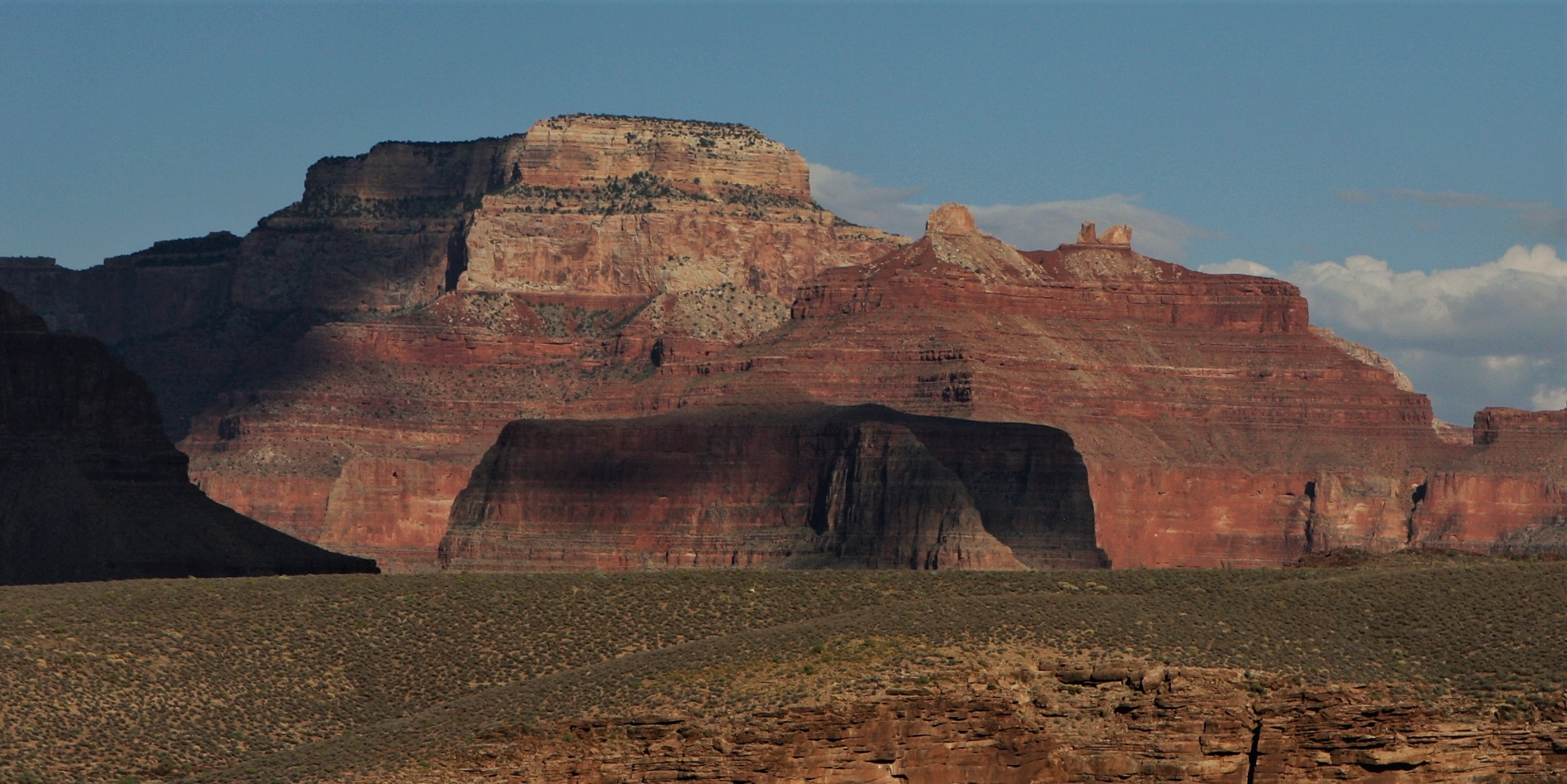
Angels Gate & Wotans Throne

The three prominence-bases of neighboring Angels Gate and Dunn Butte, and close by Thor Temple (northwest), are composed of Supai Group. Unit 4, Supai, is the cliff-former, (and therefor platform-former), Esplanade Sandstone, that has a common, and sometimes thick presence, in nearly all regions of the Grand Canyon.

For Thor Temple, the prominence platform is rectangular, on a rectangular pyramid of Supai Group. The tabletop platform contains the debris of upper eroded members, Hermit Shale, (and maybe remainder rocks of Coconino Sandstone). For Angels Gate, two Coconino Sandstone prominences (upon slope-former Hermit Shale), lies upon a northwest-by-southeast platform of Esplanade Sandstone. Angel Gate's 6,761 ft height is identical to Thor Temple's 6,741 ft elevation.

Dunn Butte, at 5,714 ft is ~1000 ft lower, and its platform ridgeline is Supai Group, unit 2, (the cliff and platform unit), Manakacha Formation, upon slopes of slope-forming Watahomigi Formation. Again, the Supai Group lies upon the platform of the Redwall Limestone massif.

== See also ==
- List of Supai Group prominences in the Grand Canyon
- Geology of the Grand Canyon area
