= Cape Royal =

Landform in the Grand Canyon, Arizona

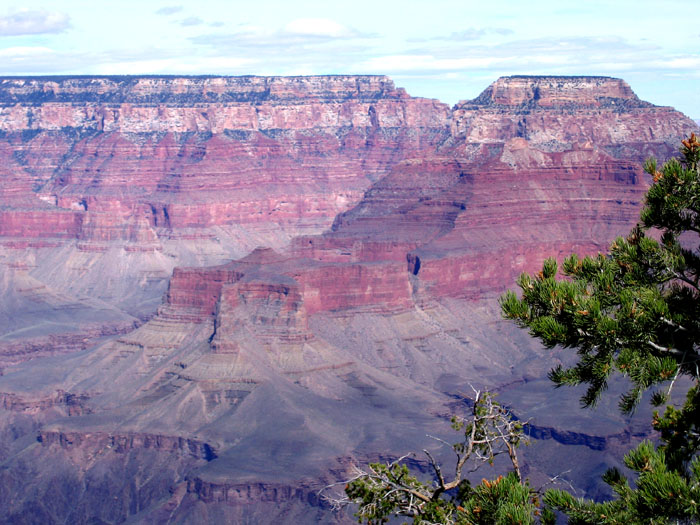
- Cape Royal, and flat, Ponderosa Pine-forested Wotans Throne

Highest point
- Elevation: 7,880 ft (2,400 m)
- Prominence: 120 ft (37 m)
- Parent peak: Cape Final
- Isolation: 1.5 mi (2.4 km)
- Coordinates: 36.119305°N 111.93785°W

Geography
- Location within Arizona Location within the United States
- Location: Grand Canyon National Park, (Walhalla Plateau); Coconino County, Arizona, US
- Parent range: Kaibab Plateau (Walhalla Plateau); Colorado Plateau
- Topo map: USGS Cape Royal

Geology
- Rock age: Permian
- Mountain type: sedimentary rock: limestone-(prominence-cliff)
- Rock type: Kaibab Limestone

Cape Royal is a 7,880+-cliff-elevation summit located in the eastern Grand Canyon, Coconino County of northern Arizona, United States. It is the southernmost viewpoint of the North Rim, viewing from north-northeast, south, west, southwest. Its next viewpoint northwest is Honan Point, with Thor Temple directly below. Directly east-northeast is the major viewing point of Cape Final, which gives views almost directly north. The 1/2 mile Cape Royal Trail starts at the parking lot and ends at the overlook at Cape Royal.

From Cape Royal, directly southeast can be seen the massif and highpoint of Freya Castle, and southeasterly is massive Wotans Throne, which is a surviving section of the North Rim, with a Ponderosa Pine, forested, flat prominence. The cliffs of Cape Royal are composed of Kaibab Limestone, on erodible Toroweap Formation, upon white cliffs of Coconino Sandstone. The watershed drainage from Cape Royal, overlooks the Unkar Creek and Canyon to the south into the Colorado River, about 6 miles distant.

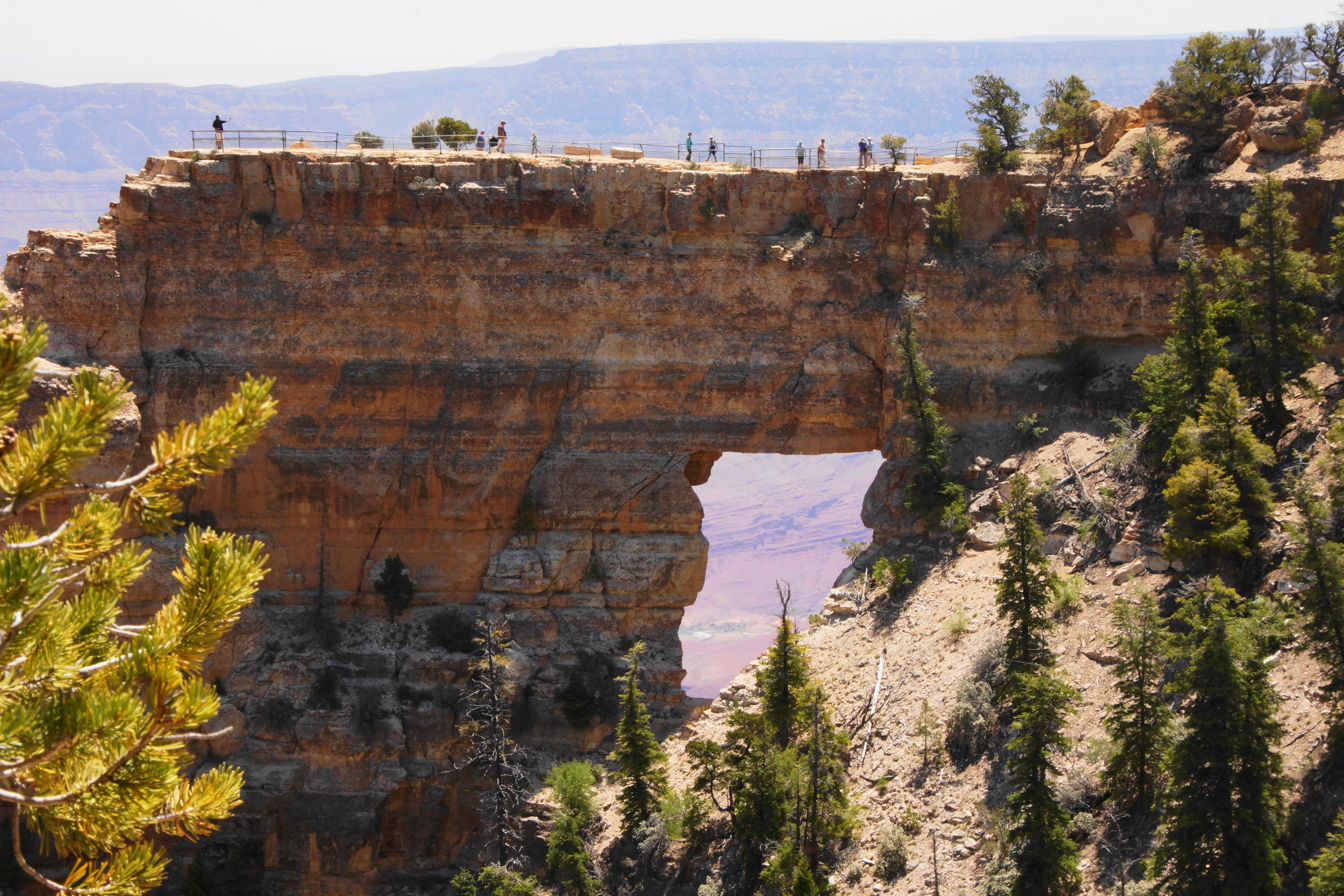
Angels Window overlook, 1/3 mile north-northeast of Cape Royal point

== Gallery ==
- Cape Final & Jupiter Temple; views ~east-northeast, to Cape Final.
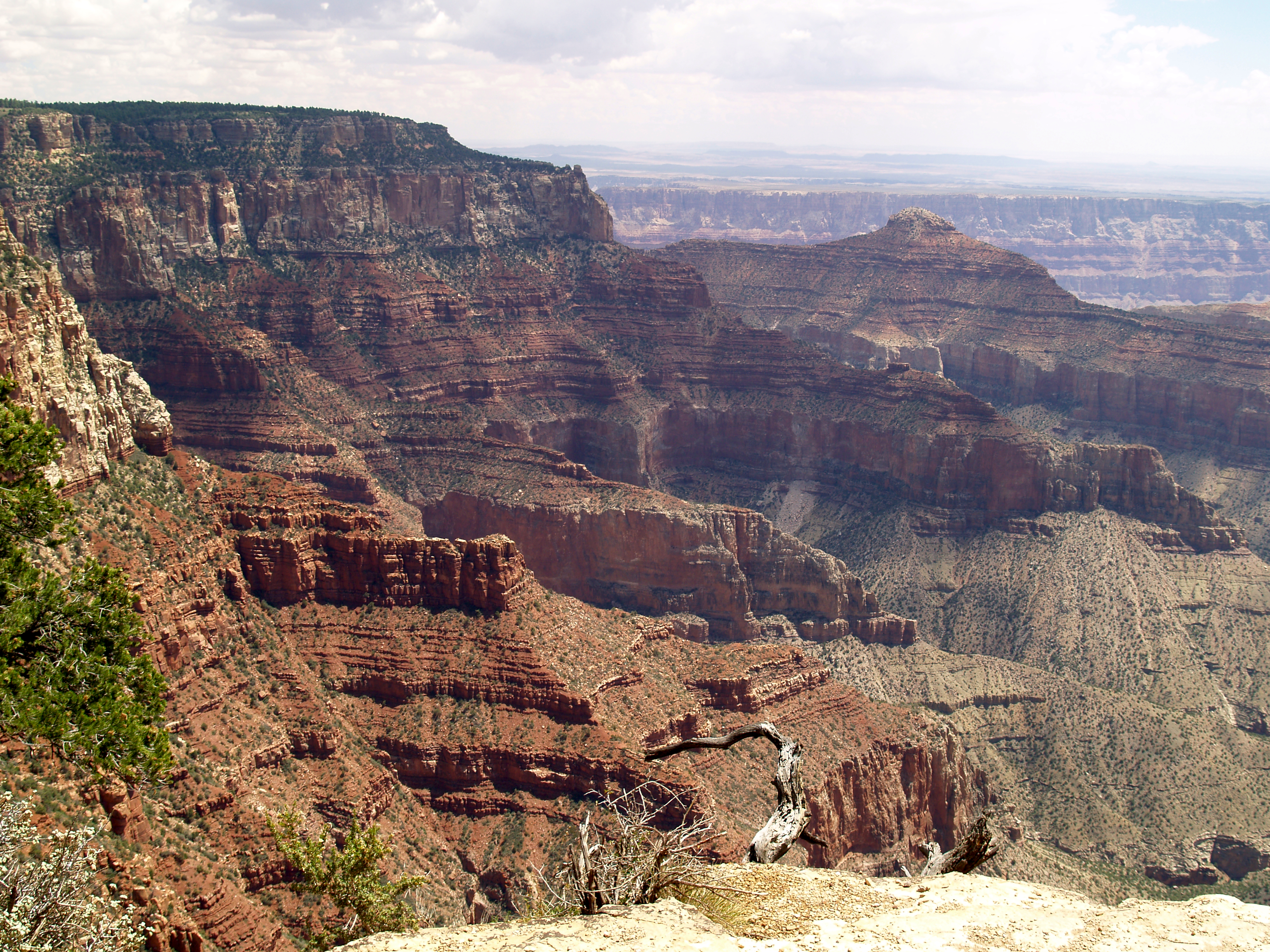

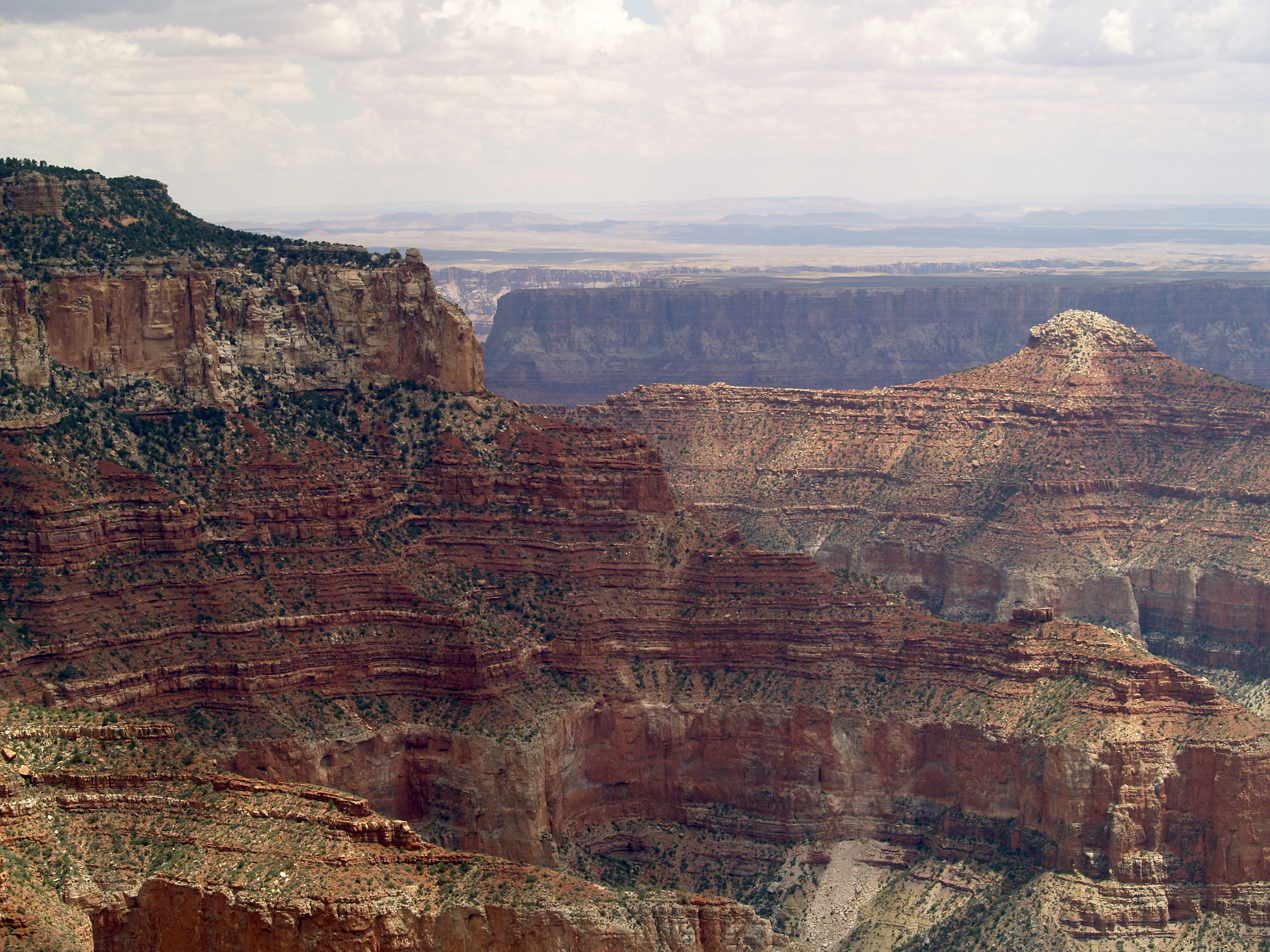
Closeup
- Vishnu Temple and Freya Castle
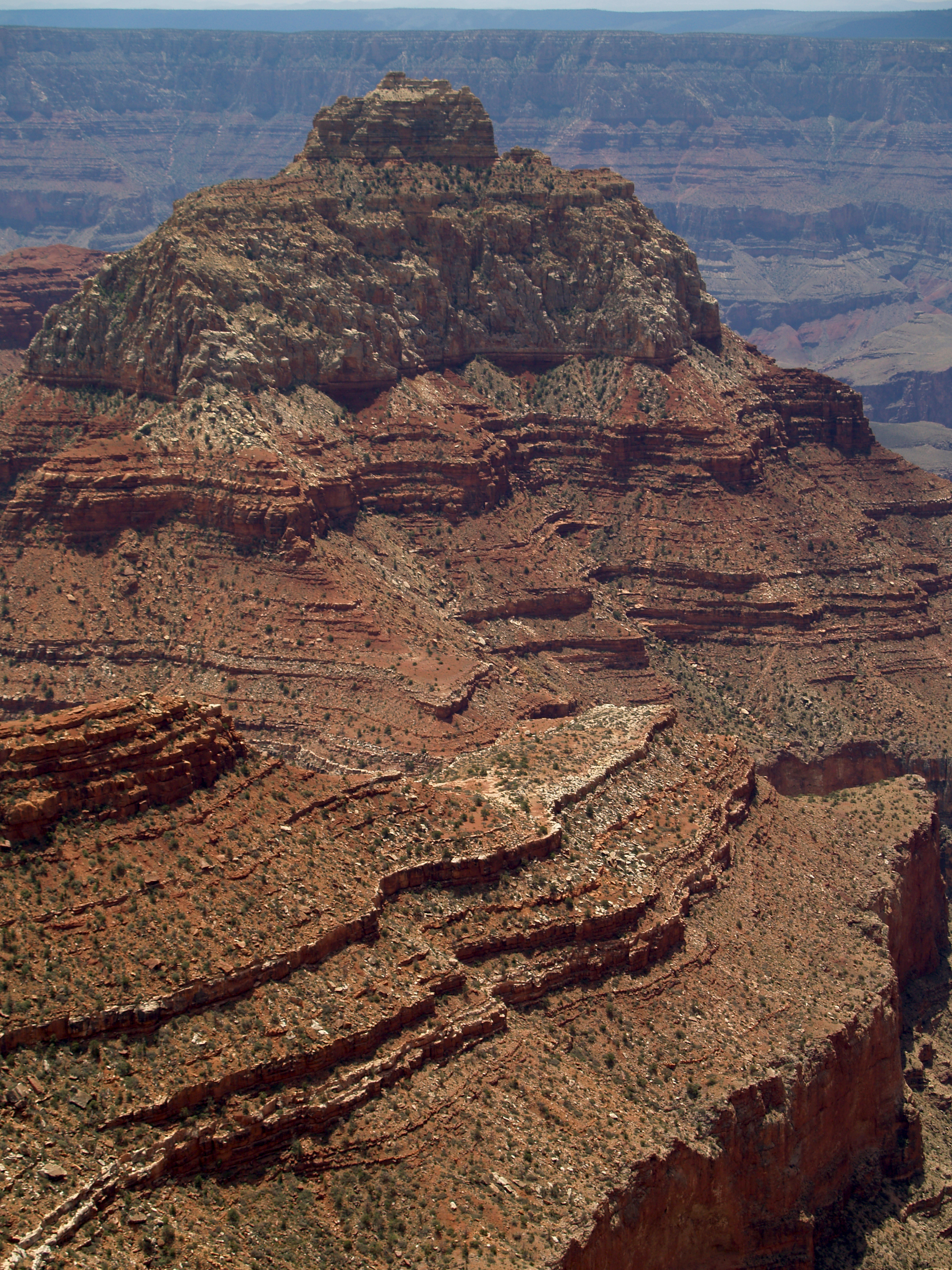
Vishnu Temple

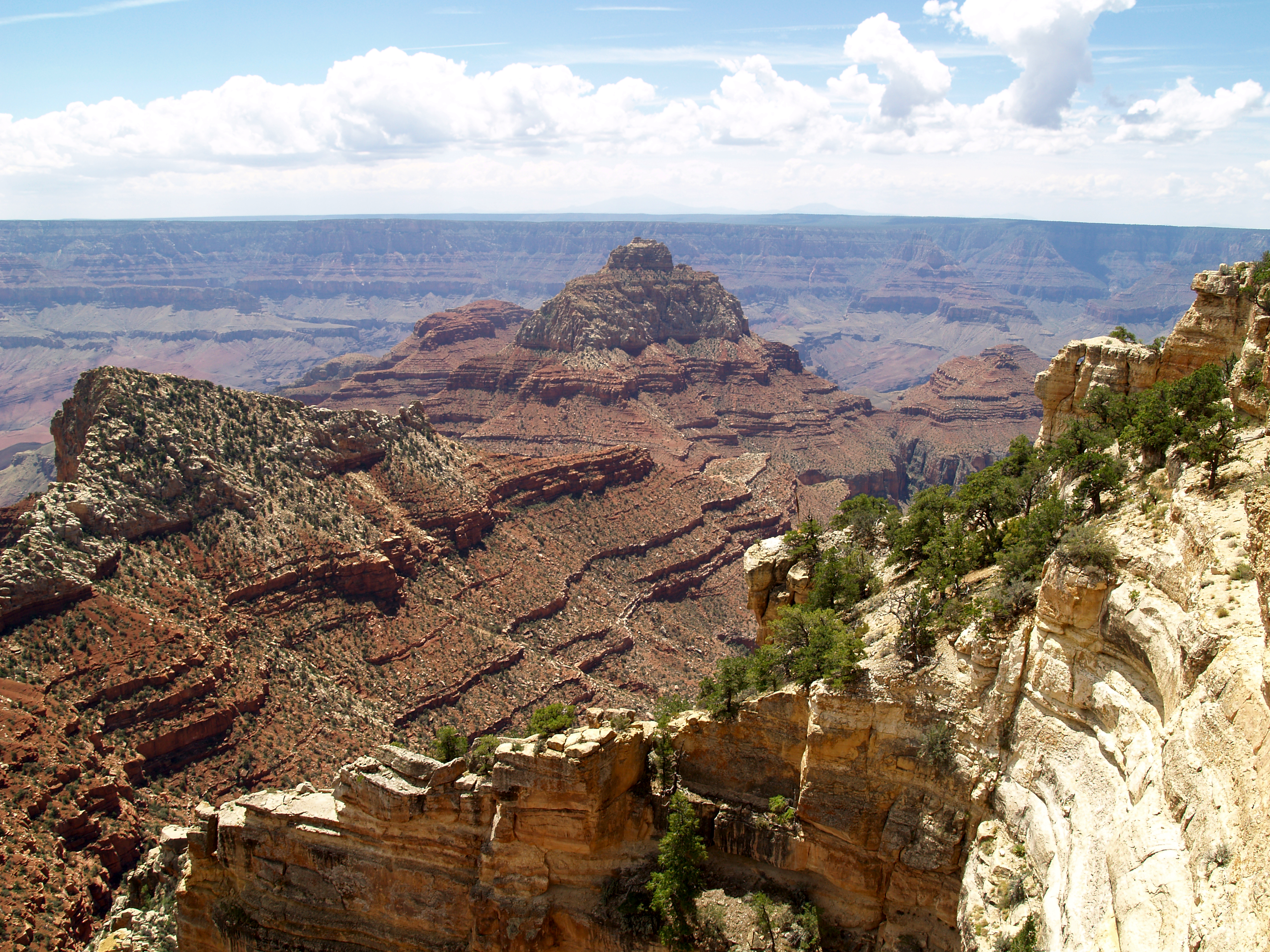
Freya Castle & Vishnu Temple
- Wotans Throne and Angels Gate; viewed ~south-southwest, 1.5 miles distant.
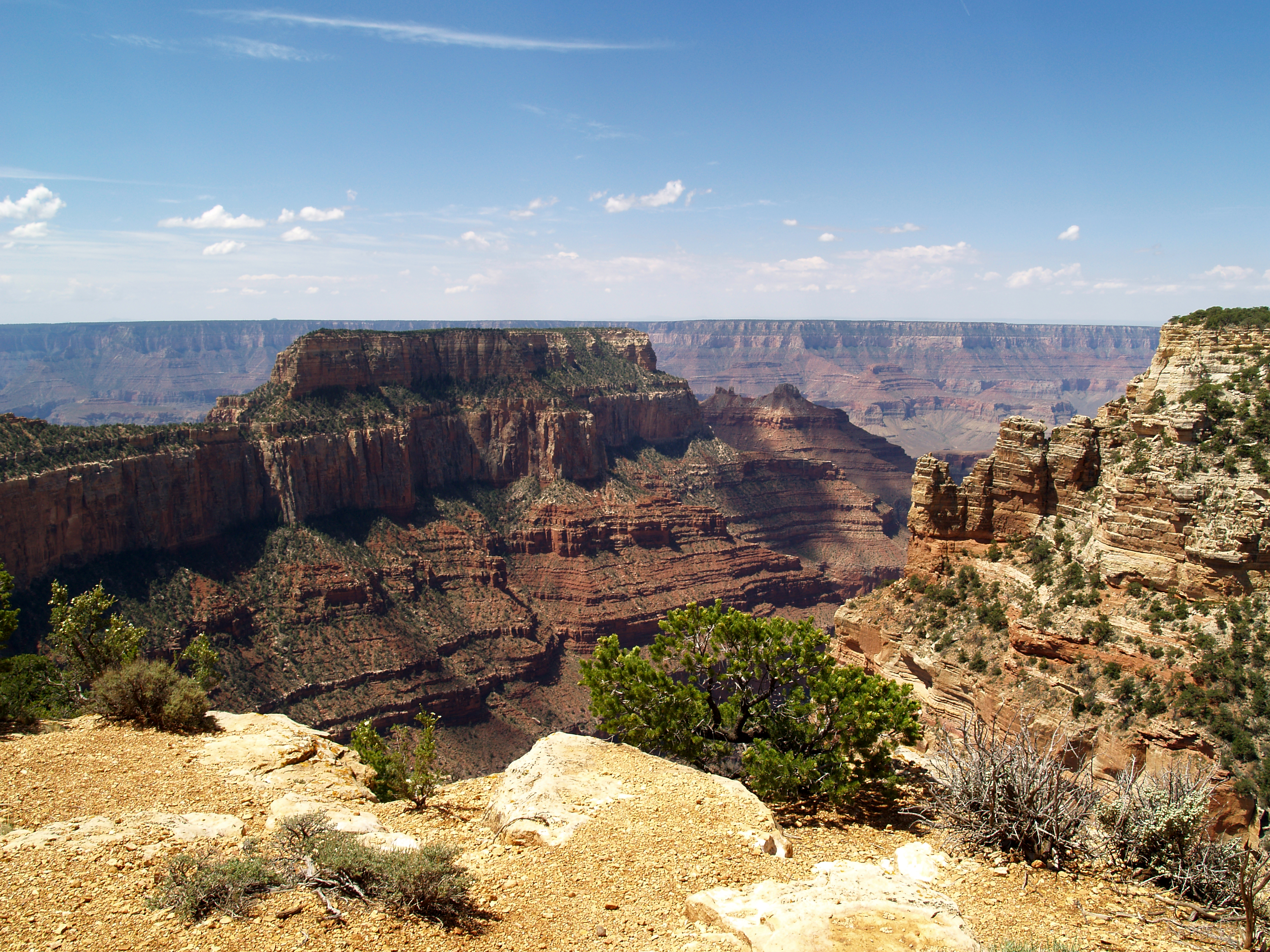
Wotans Throne & Angels Gate

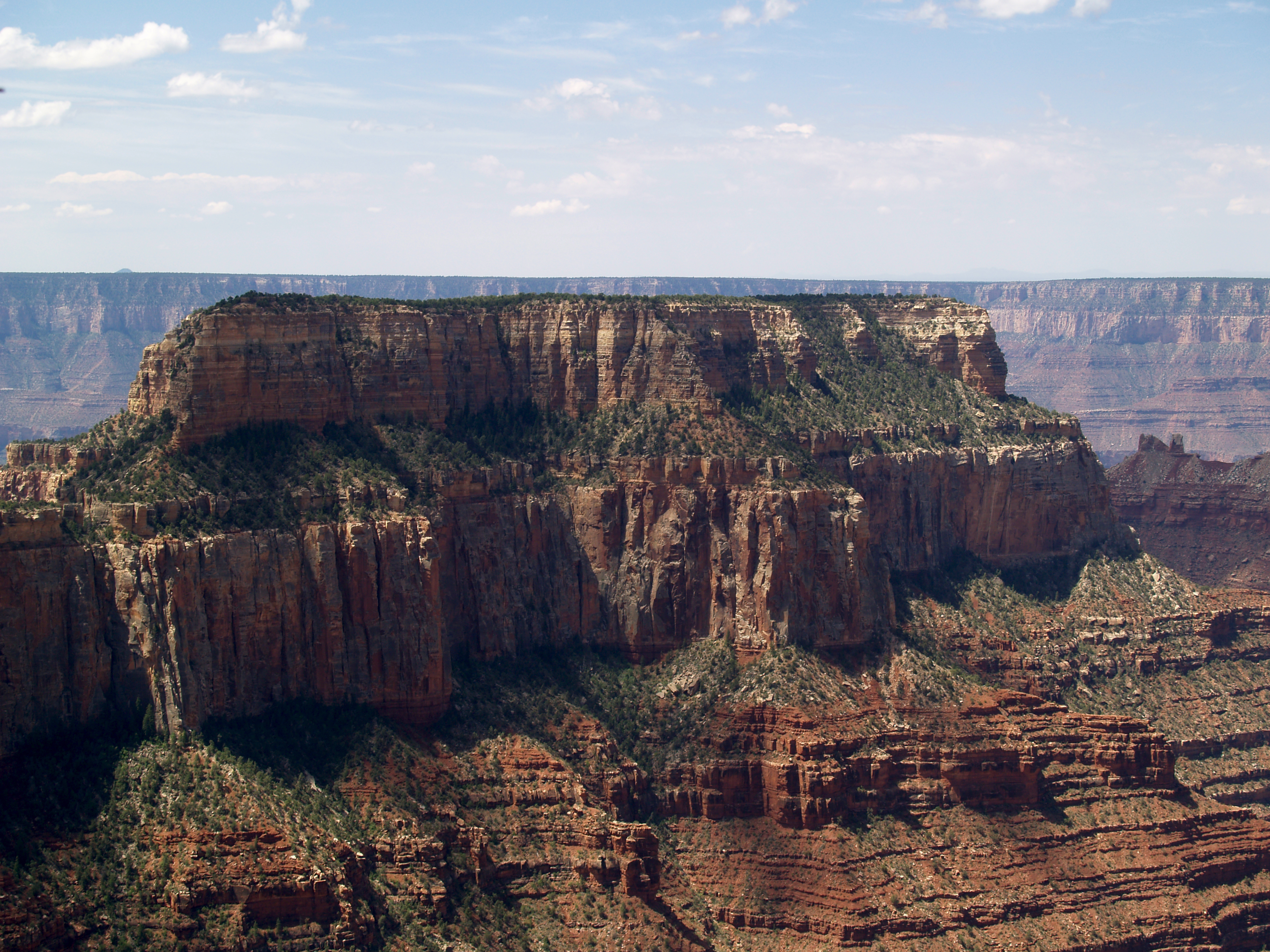
Wotans Throne

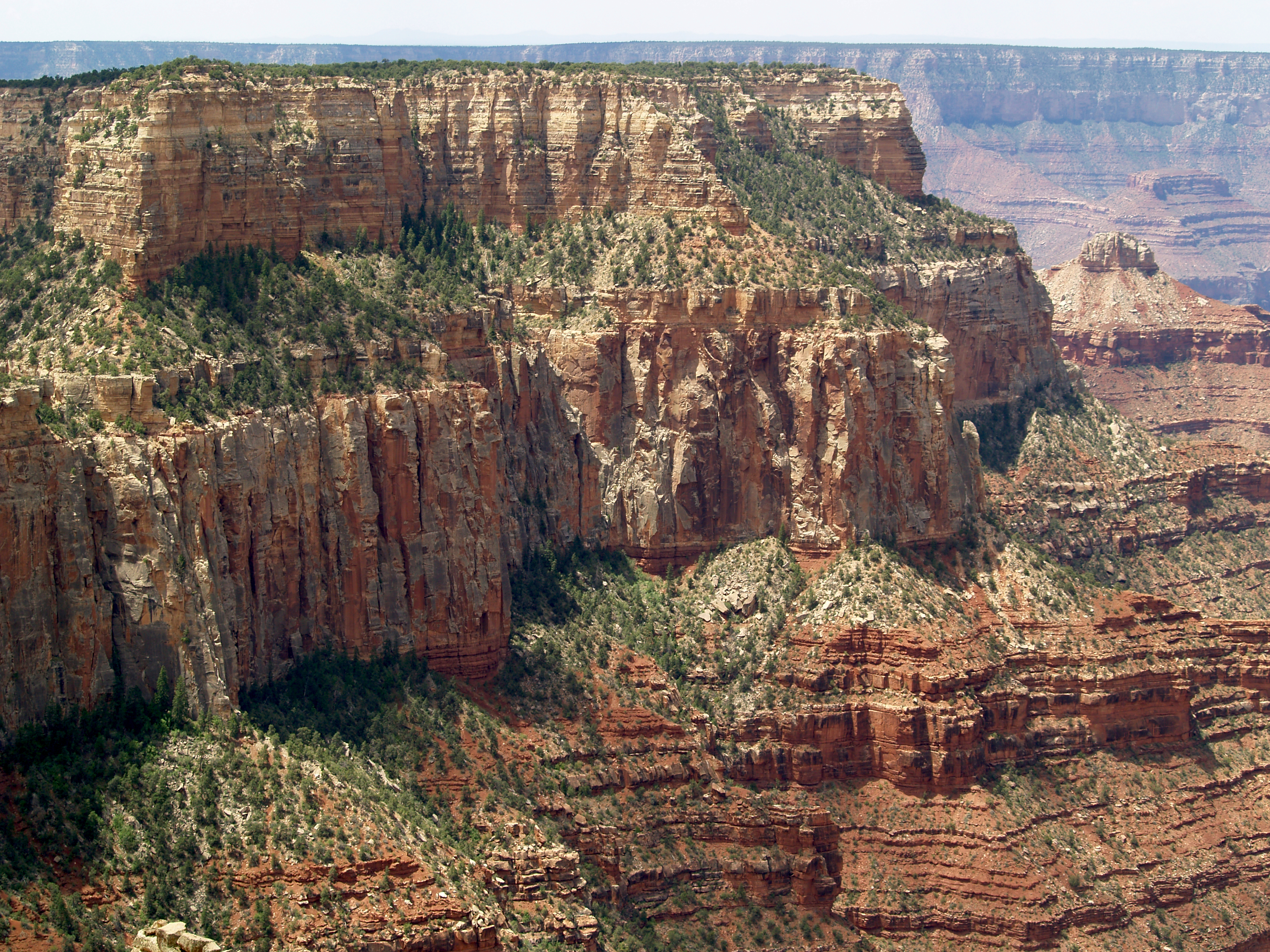
Wotans Throne & Angels Gate - prominence

== See also ==
- Geology of the Grand Canyon area
- Atoko Point
