= Thor Temple =

Landform in the Grand Canyon, Arizona

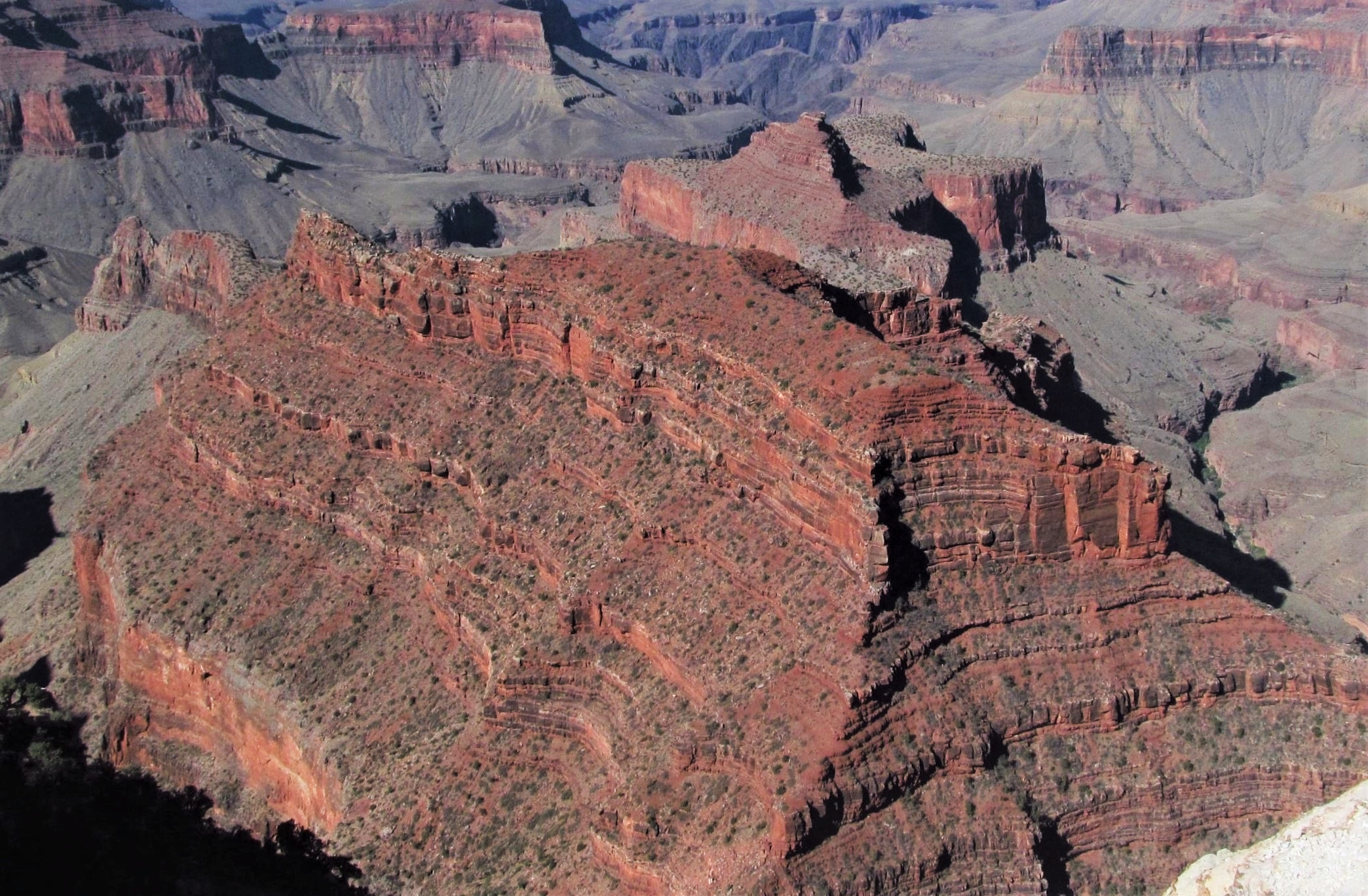
- North aspect, from North Rim

Highest point
- Elevation: 6,741 ft (2,055 m)
- Prominence: 769 ft (234 m)
- Parent peak: Wotans Throne (7,740 ft)
- Isolation: 2.12 mi (3.41 km)
- Coordinates: 36°07′50″N 111°58′51″W

Geography
- Location within Arizona Location within the United States
- Country: United States
- State: Arizona
- County: Coconino
- Protected area: Grand Canyon National Park
- Parent range: Kaibab Plateau; Colorado Plateau
- Topo map: USGS Walhalla Plateau

Geology
- Rock type(s): limestone, shale, sandstone

Climbing
- First ascent: Alan Doty, May 1977
- Easiest route: class 4 climbing

Thor Temple is a 6,741-foot (2,055 m)-elevation summit located in the Grand Canyon, in Coconino County of northern Arizona, United States. It is situated 2.5 miles (4.0 km) west-northwest of Cape Royal on the canyon's North Rim, 3.5 miles (5.6 km) east of Brahma Temple, and 2 miles (3.2 km) north-northwest of Wotans Throne. It rises 4,300 feet (1,300 m) above the Colorado River in 5 miles (8.0 km). According to the Köppen climate classification system, Thor Temple is located in a cold semi-arid climate zone.

Thor Temple is named for Thor, the hammer-wielding god associated with lightning, thunder, and storms in Germanic mythology, and son of Wotan. This name was applied by geologist François E. Matthes, in keeping with Clarence Dutton's practice of naming geographical features in the Grand Canyon after mythological deities. A variant name for this landform is "Thors Hammer." This geographical feature's name was officially adopted in 1906 by the U.S. Board on Geographic Names.

== Geology ==
Thor Temple is composed of strata of the Pennsylvanian-Permian Supai Group. Further down are strata of Mississippian Redwall Limestone, Cambrian Tonto Group, and finally Proterozoic Unkar Group at creek level. Precipitation runoff from Thor Temple drains southwest to the Colorado River via Clear Creek.

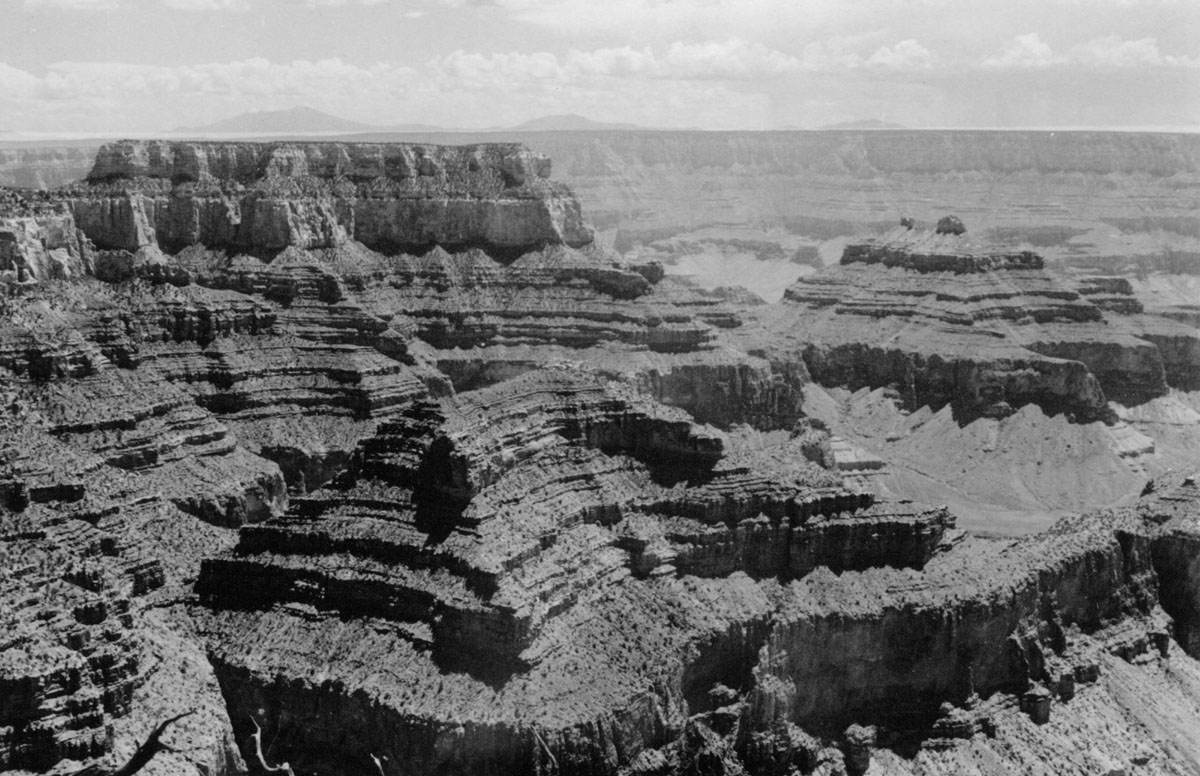
Thor Temple bottom, Wotans Throne upper left, Angels Gate right. Looking south from Francois Matthes Point, 1951.

== See also ==
- Geology of the Grand Canyon area
