= Wotans Throne =

Landform in the Grand Canyon, Arizona

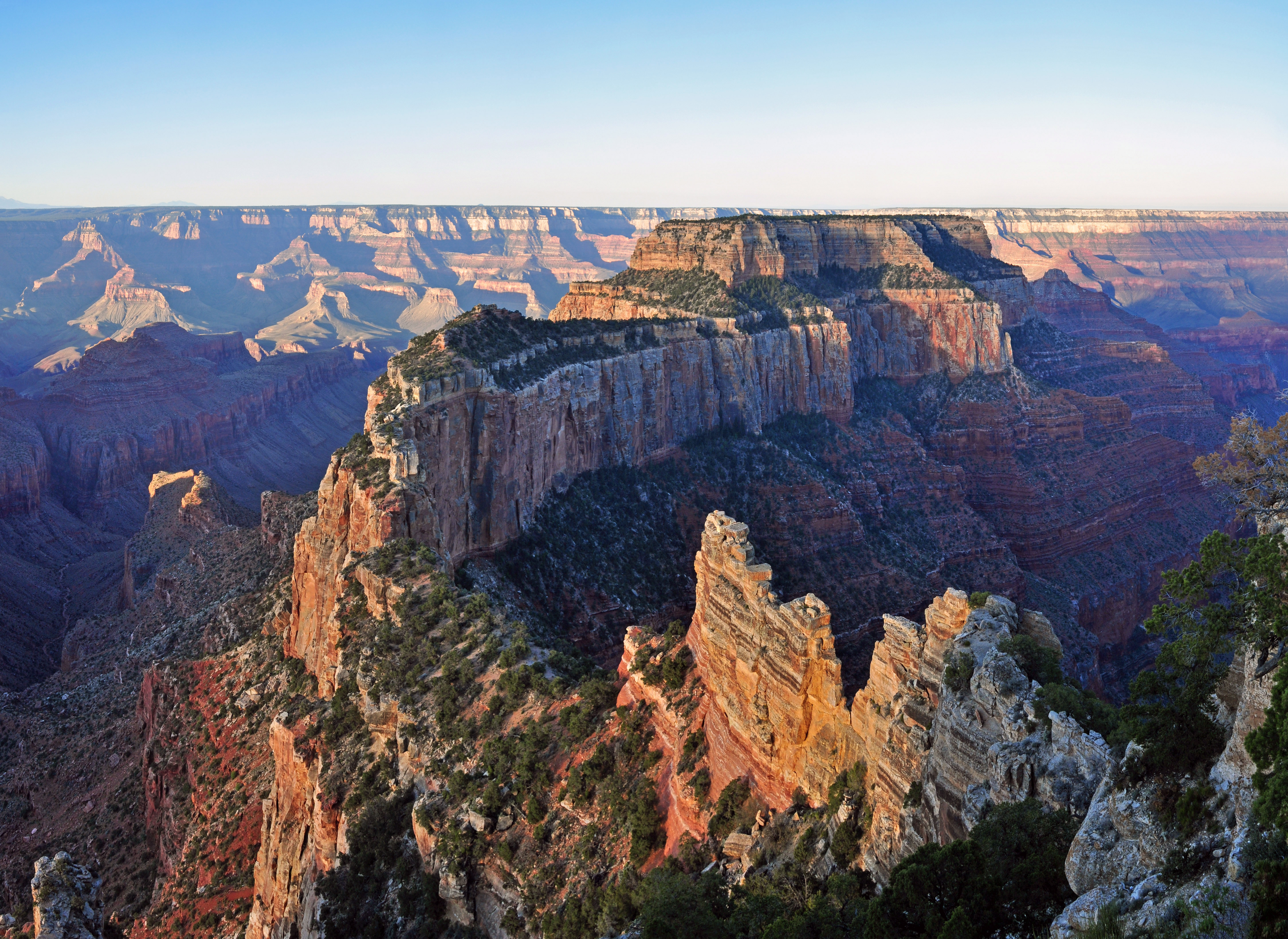
- Northeast aspect, from Cape Royal Overlook

Highest point
- Elevation: 7,721 ft (2,353 m)
- Prominence: 596 ft (182 m)
- Parent peak: Siegfried Pyre (7,922 ft)
- Isolation: 7.04 mi (11.33 km)
- Coordinates: 36°06′17″N 111°57′37″W

Geography
- Location within Arizona Location within the United States
- Country: United States
- State: Arizona
- County: Coconino
- Protected area: Grand Canyon National Park
- Parent range: Kaibab Plateau; Colorado Plateau
- Topo map: USGS Cape Royal

Geology
- Rock type(s): sandstone, limestone, shale

Wotans Throne is a 7,721-foot-elevation (2,353-meter) summit located in the Grand Canyon, in Coconino County, Arizona, US. It is situated one mile immediately southwest of the Cape Royal overlook on the canyon's North Rim, 1.7 miles west-southwest of Freya Castle, two miles west-northwest of Vishnu Temple, and five miles east of Zoroaster Temple. It rises 5,200 feet (1,600 meters) above the Colorado River.

Wotans Throne is named for Wotan, the supreme Germanic deity. This toponym was applied by geologist François E. Matthes, in keeping with Clarence Dutton's practice of naming geographical features in the Grand Canyon after mythological deities. This geographical feature's name was officially adopted in 1906 by the U.S. Board on Geographic Names. According to the Köppen climate classification system, Wotans Throne is located in a Cold semi-arid climate zone.

== Geology ==
The wooded top of Wotans Throne is composed of 700-feet-thick Kaibab Limestone overlaying 300-feet-thick, cream-colored, cliff-forming, Permian Coconino Sandstone. The sandstone, which is the third-youngest of the strata in the Grand Canyon, was deposited 265 million years ago as sand dunes. Below the Coconino Sandstone is slope-forming, Permian Hermit Formation, which in turn overlays the Pennsylvanian-Permian Supai Group. Further down are strata of Mississippian Redwall Limestone, Cambrian Tonto Group, and finally Proterozoic Unkar Group at creek level. Precipitation runoff from Wotans Throne drains south to the Colorado River via Vishnu Creek on its east side, and Clear Creek on the west side.

== Gallery ==
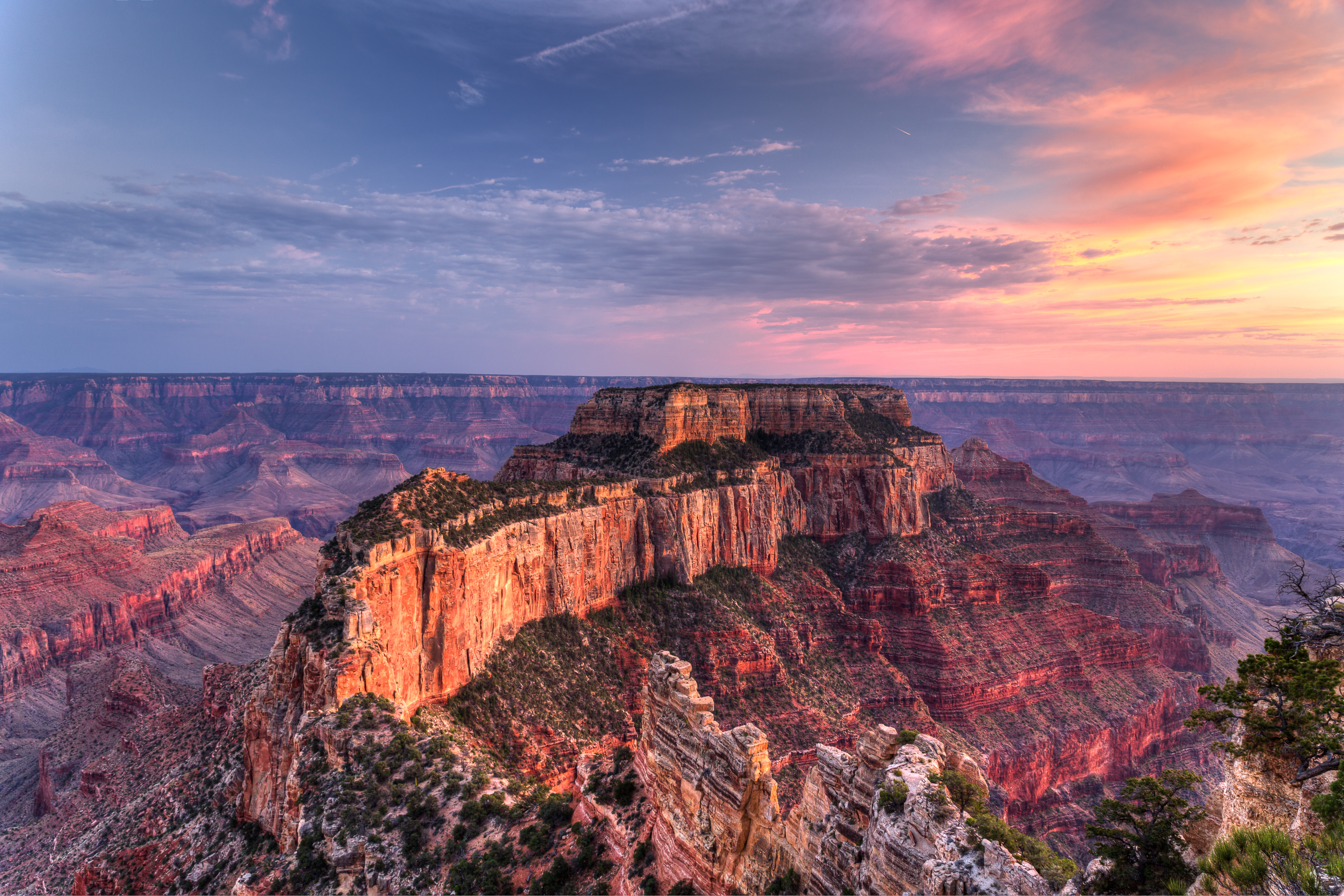
At sunset from Cape Royal

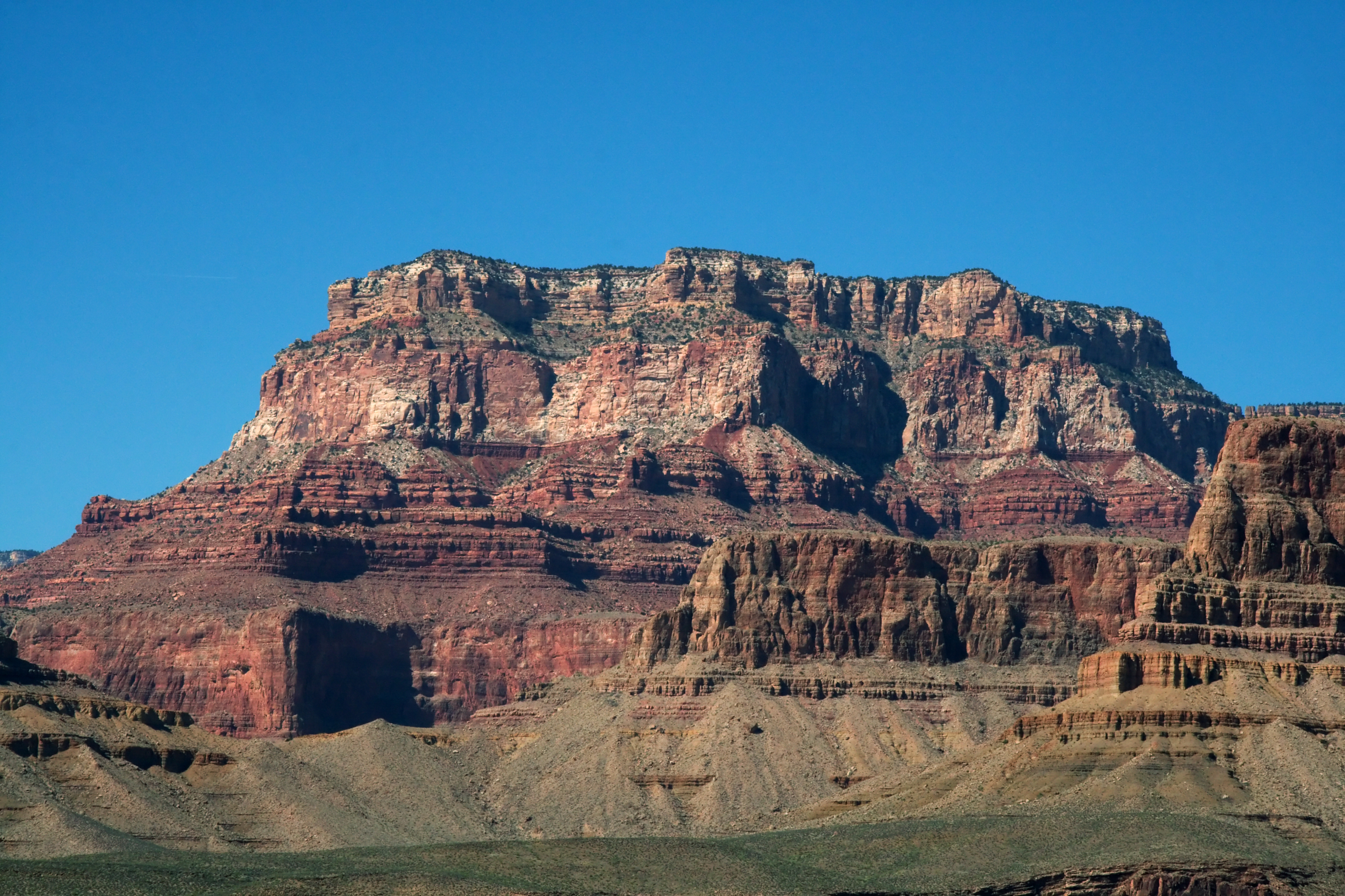
South aspect

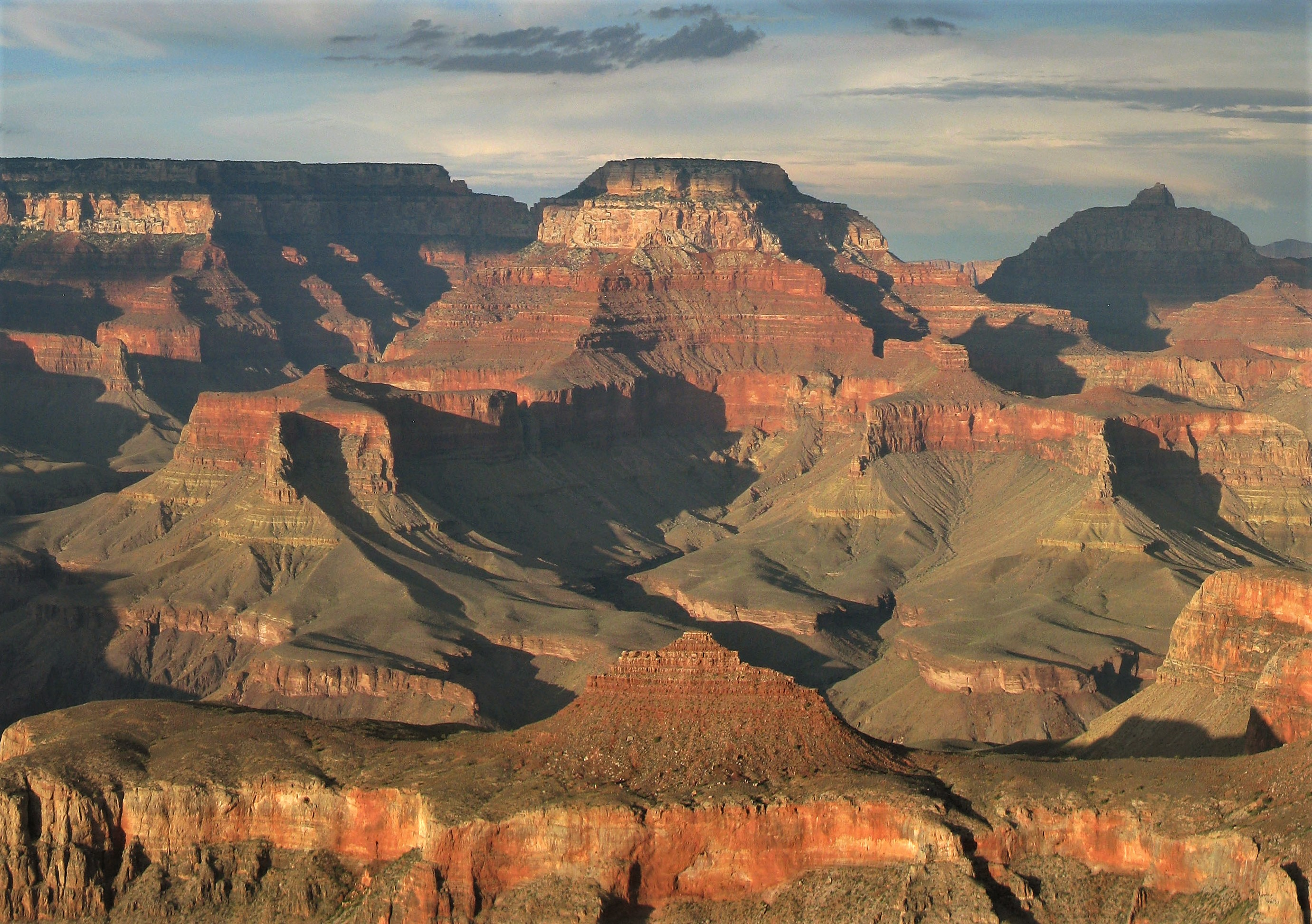
Wotans Throne, with Angels Gate in front blending in

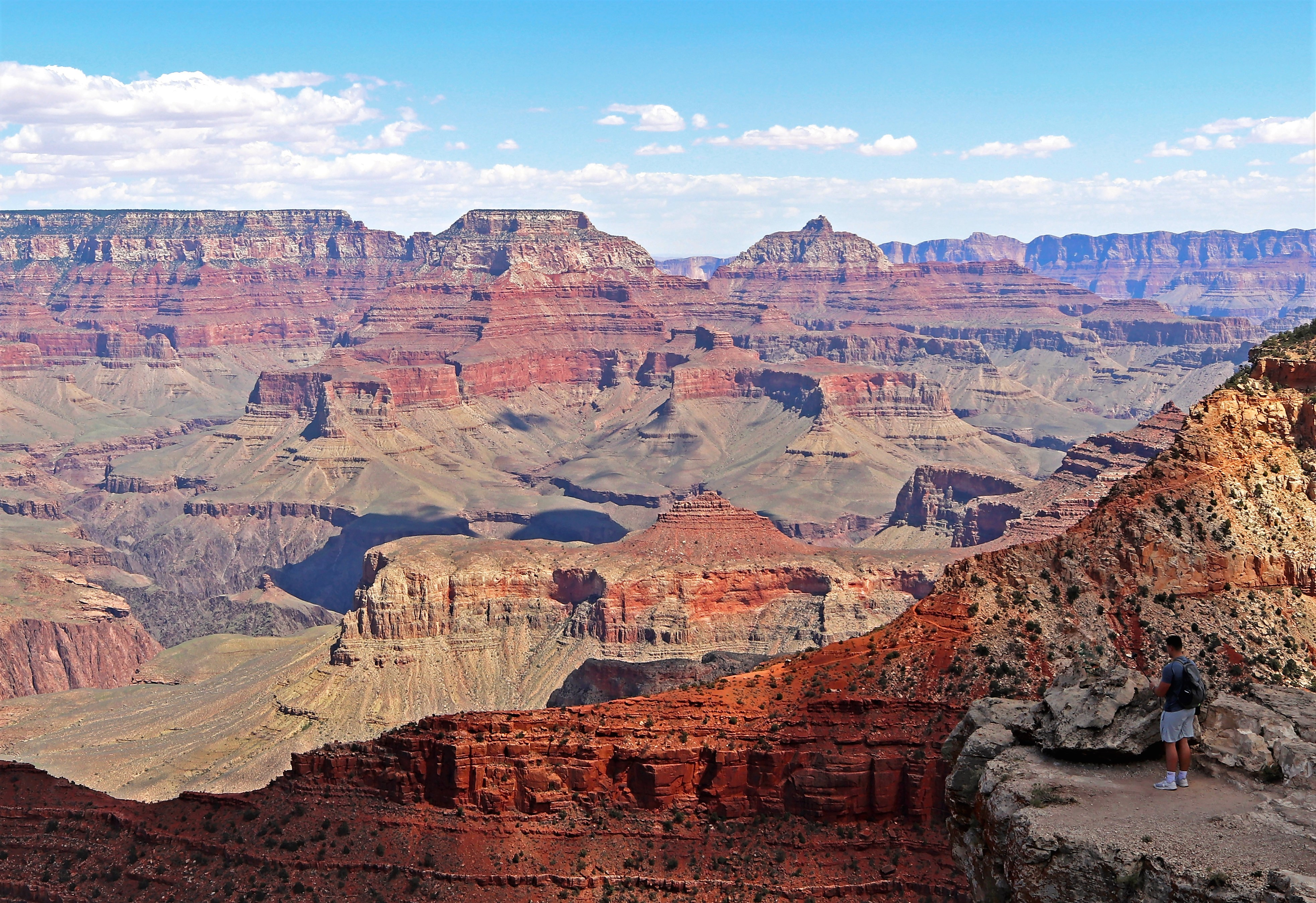
Wotans Throne left of center with Vishnu Temple to right, seen from South Rim

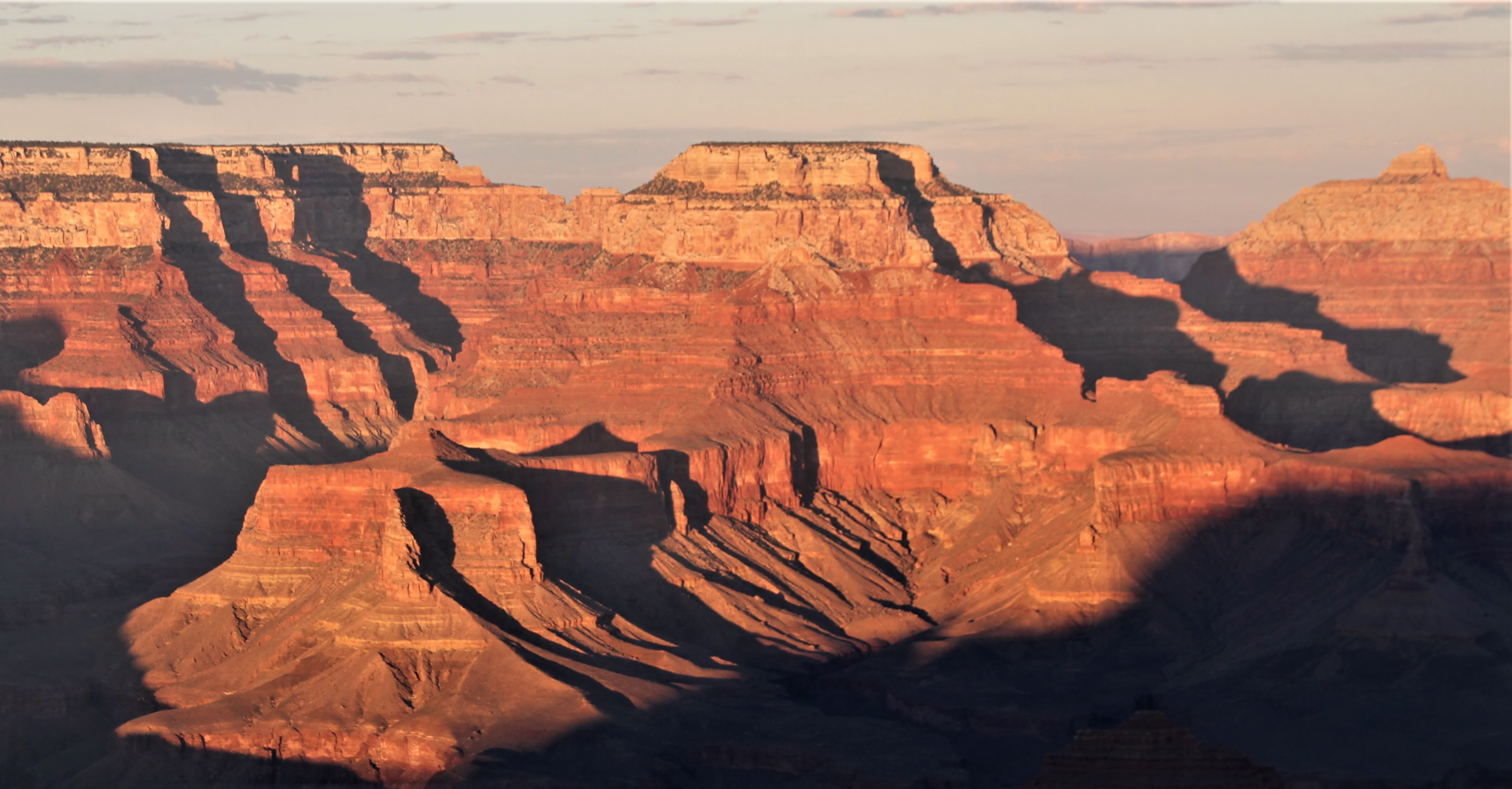
Wotans Throne (centered), from South Rim at sunset

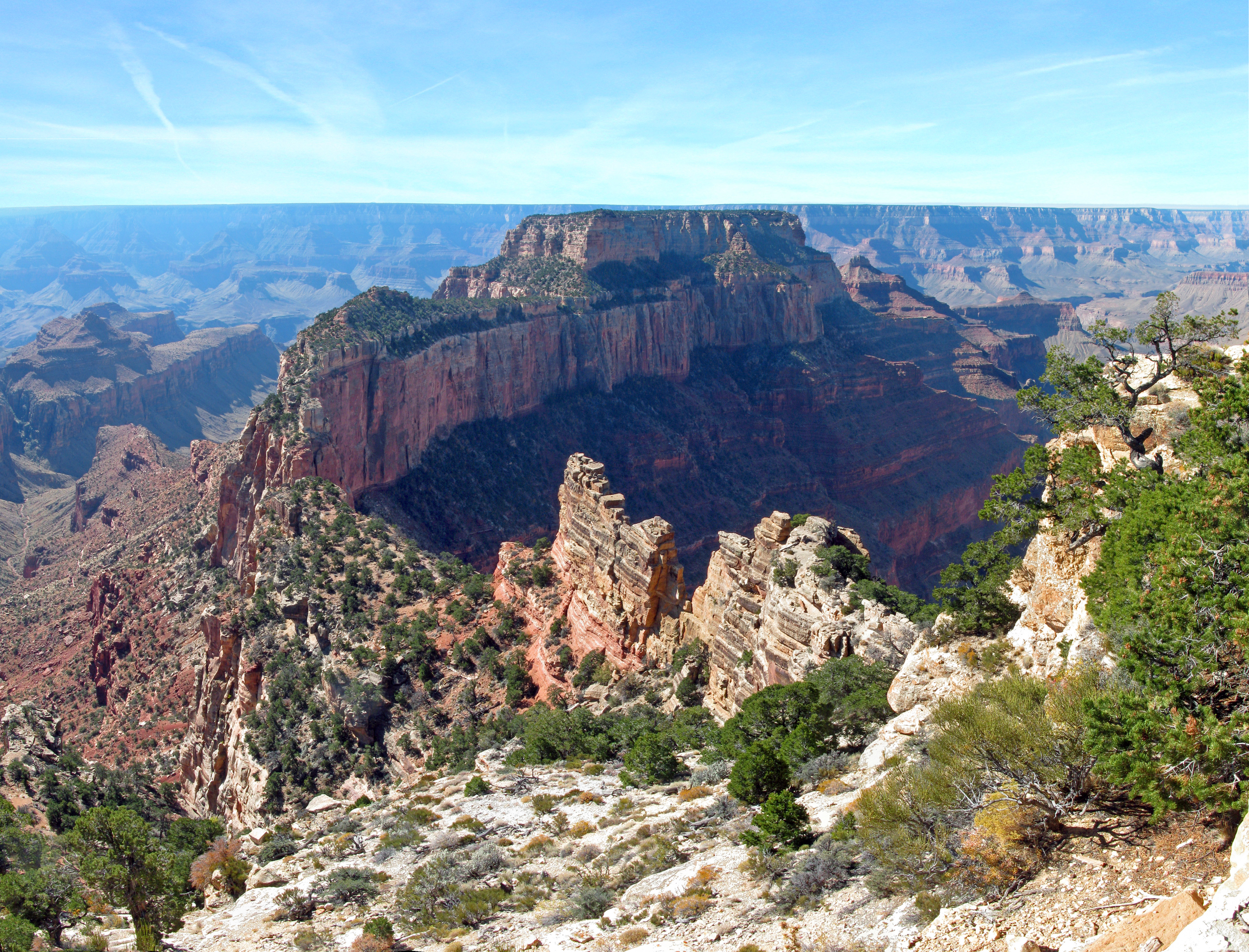
From Cape Royal

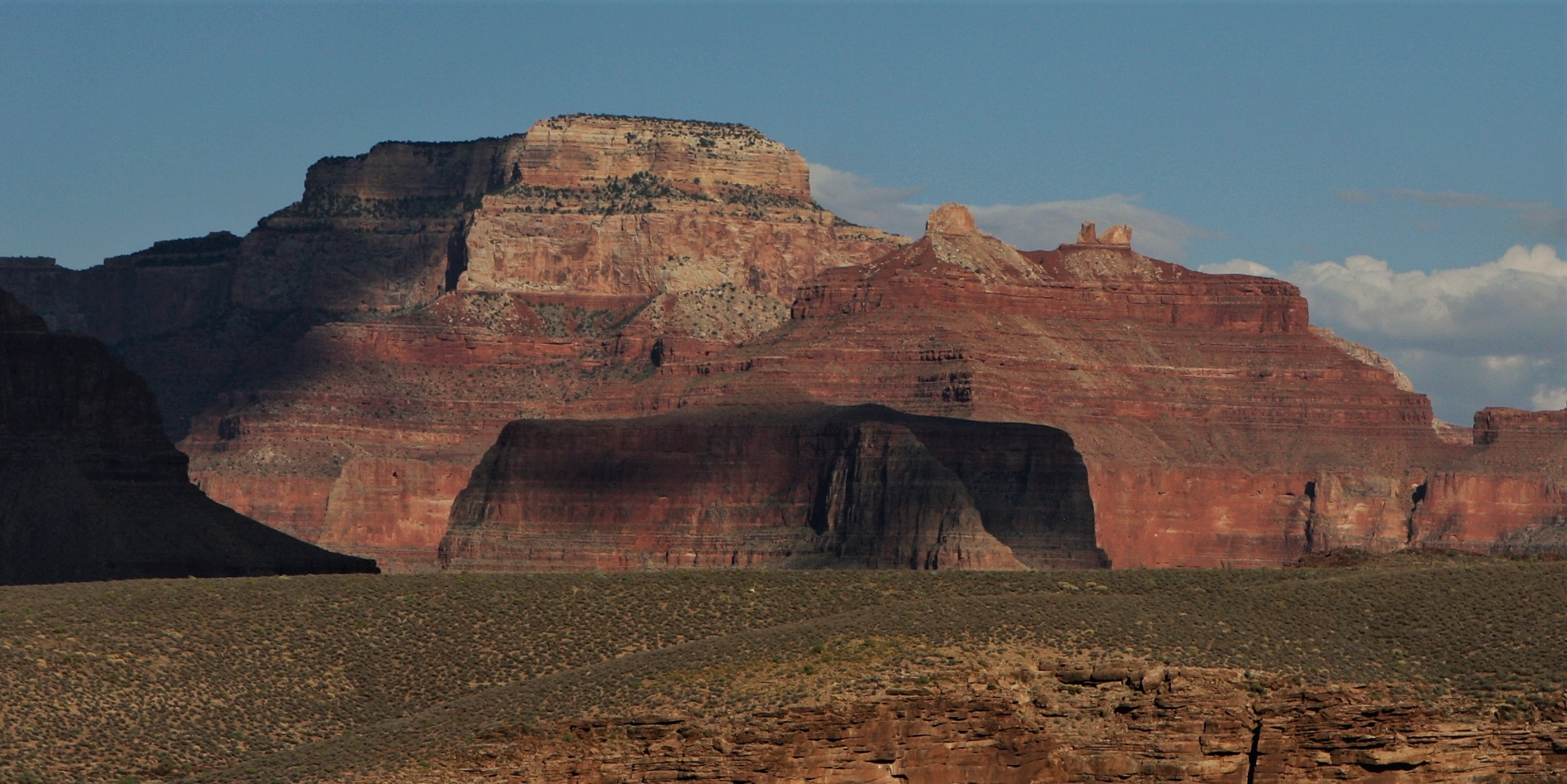
Wotans Throne (left) and Angels Gate from west

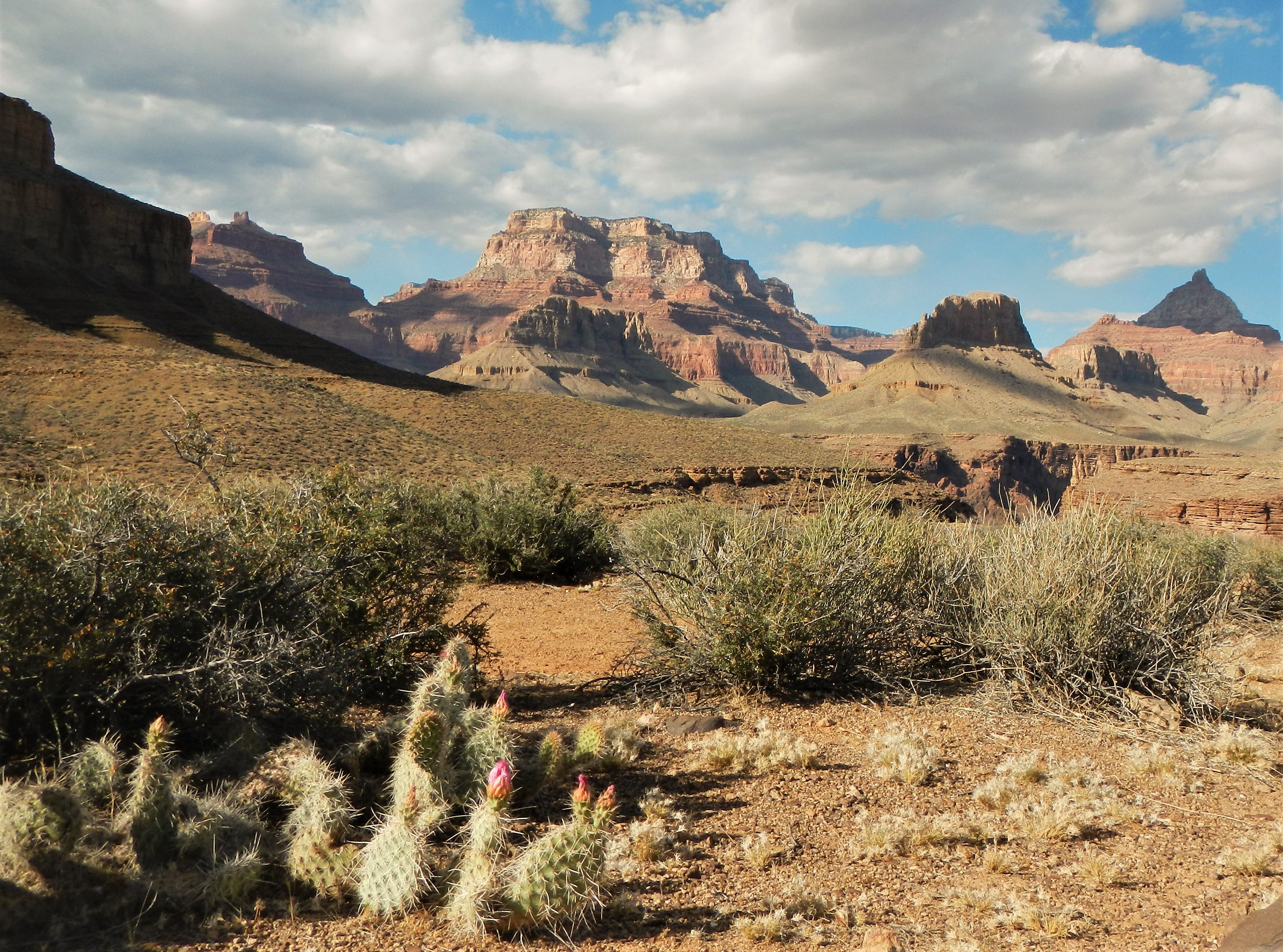
From the south. Left to right: Angels Gate, Wotans Throne, Newberry Butte, and Vishnu Temple

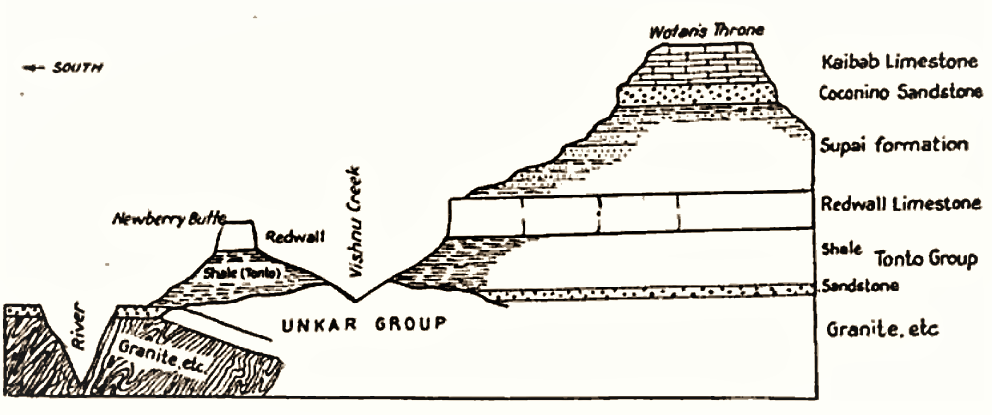

== See also ==
- Geology of the Grand Canyon area
- Cape Royal
