= Angels Gate =

Landform in the Grand Canyon, Arizona

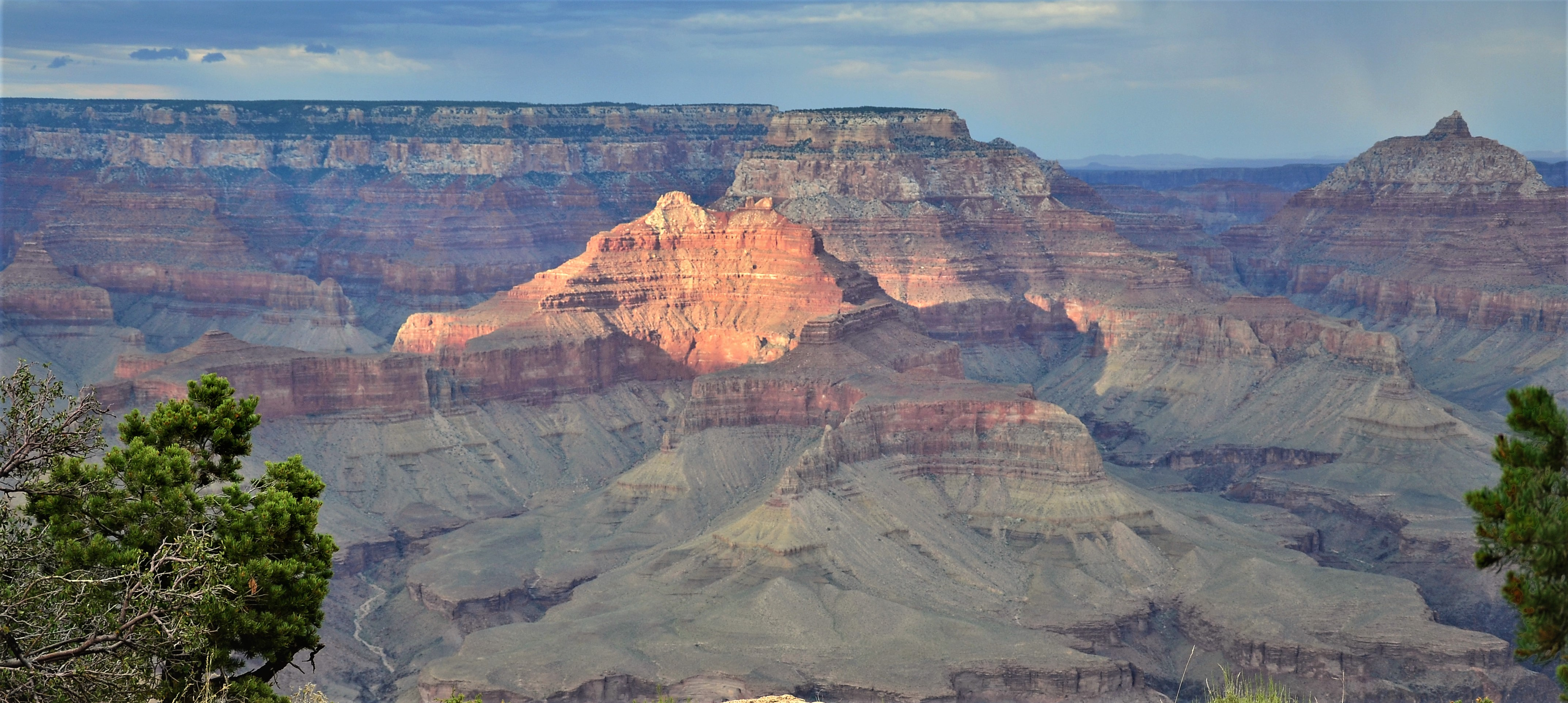
- Angels Gate illuminated, from Shoshone Point

Highest point
- Elevation: 6,761 ft (2,061 m)
- Prominence: 1,361 ft (415 m)
- Parent peak: Wotans Throne (7,721 ft)
- Isolation: 1.53 mi (2.46 km)
- Coordinates: 36°05′38″N 111°59′24″W

Geography
- Location within Arizona Location within the United States
- Country: United States
- State: Arizona
- County: Coconino
- Protected area: Grand Canyon National Park
- Parent range: Kaibab Plateau; Colorado Plateau
- Topo map: USGS Cape Royal

Geology
- Rock type(s): sandstone, siltstone, mudstone

Climbing
- First ascent: April 1972
- Easiest route: class 5.8 climbing

Angels Gate is a 6,761-foot (2,061 m)-elevation summit located in the Grand Canyon, in Coconino County of Arizona, United States. It is situated seven miles (11 km) due north of the Grandview Point overlook on the canyon's South Rim, three miles (4.8 km) west of Vishnu Temple, and three point five miles (5.6 km) southeast of Zoroaster Temple. Topographic relief is significant as it rises over 4,200 feet (1,300 m) above the Colorado River in three miles. Angels Gate is the place in Paiute mythology where the gods would return to Earth by descending from the shadow world above.

George Wharton James applied the "Angel Gate" name to this geographical feature in his book, In & Around the Grand Canyon, in 1900. This feature's name was officially adopted in 1906 by the U.S. Board on Geographic Names. Angels Gate has four peaks composed of Coconino Sandstone. The main highest summit and three spires are known as "Snoopy and his Doghouse" for a resemblance to Snoopy, and the first ascent was made April 1972 by Chuck Graf and Dave Ganci. According to the Köppen climate classification system, Angels Gate is located in a cold semi-arid climate zone.

== Geology ==
The summit of Angels Gate is composed of remnant, cliff-forming, Permian Coconino Sandstone. The sandstone, which is the third-youngest of the strata in the Grand Canyon, was deposited 265 million years ago as sand dunes. Below the Coconino Sandstone is slope-forming, Permian Hermit Formation, which in turn overlays the Pennsylvanian-Permian Supai Group. Further down are strata of Mississippian Redwall Limestone, Cambrian Tonto Group, and finally Proterozoic Unkar Group at creek level and Granite Gorge. Precipitation runoff from Angels Gate drains south to the Colorado River.

== Gallery ==
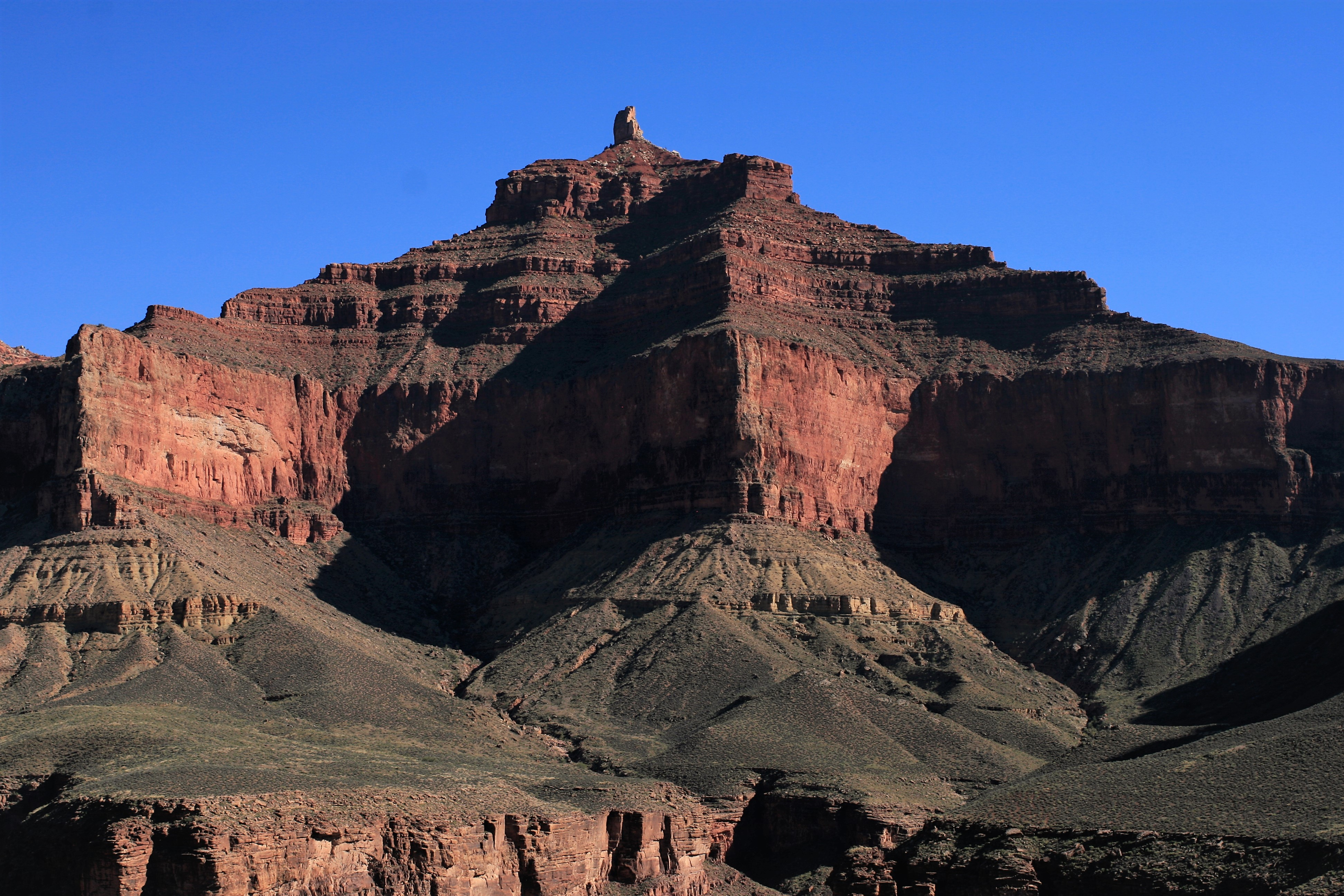
Northwest aspect

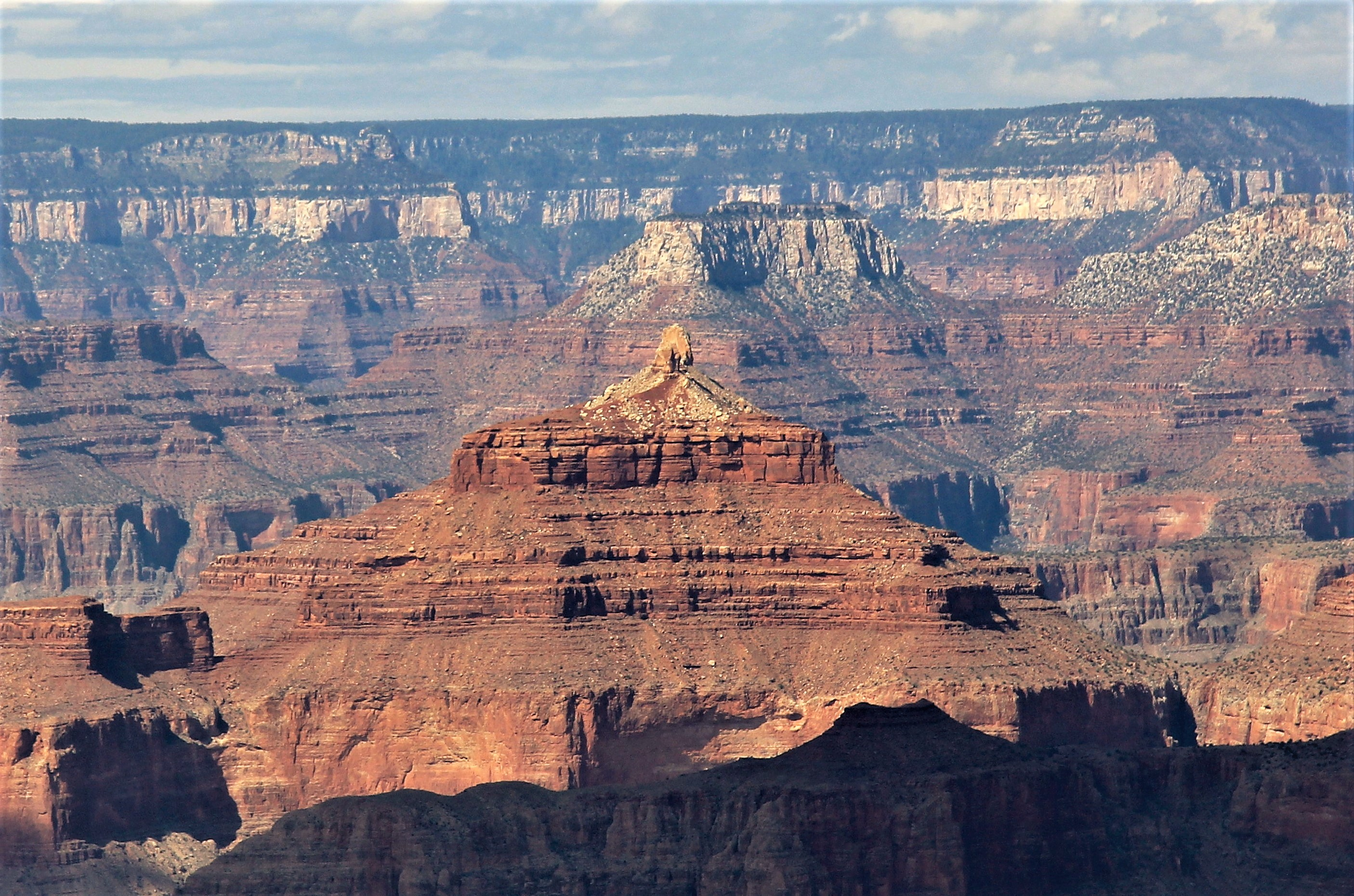
Angels Gate, with Deva Temple behind

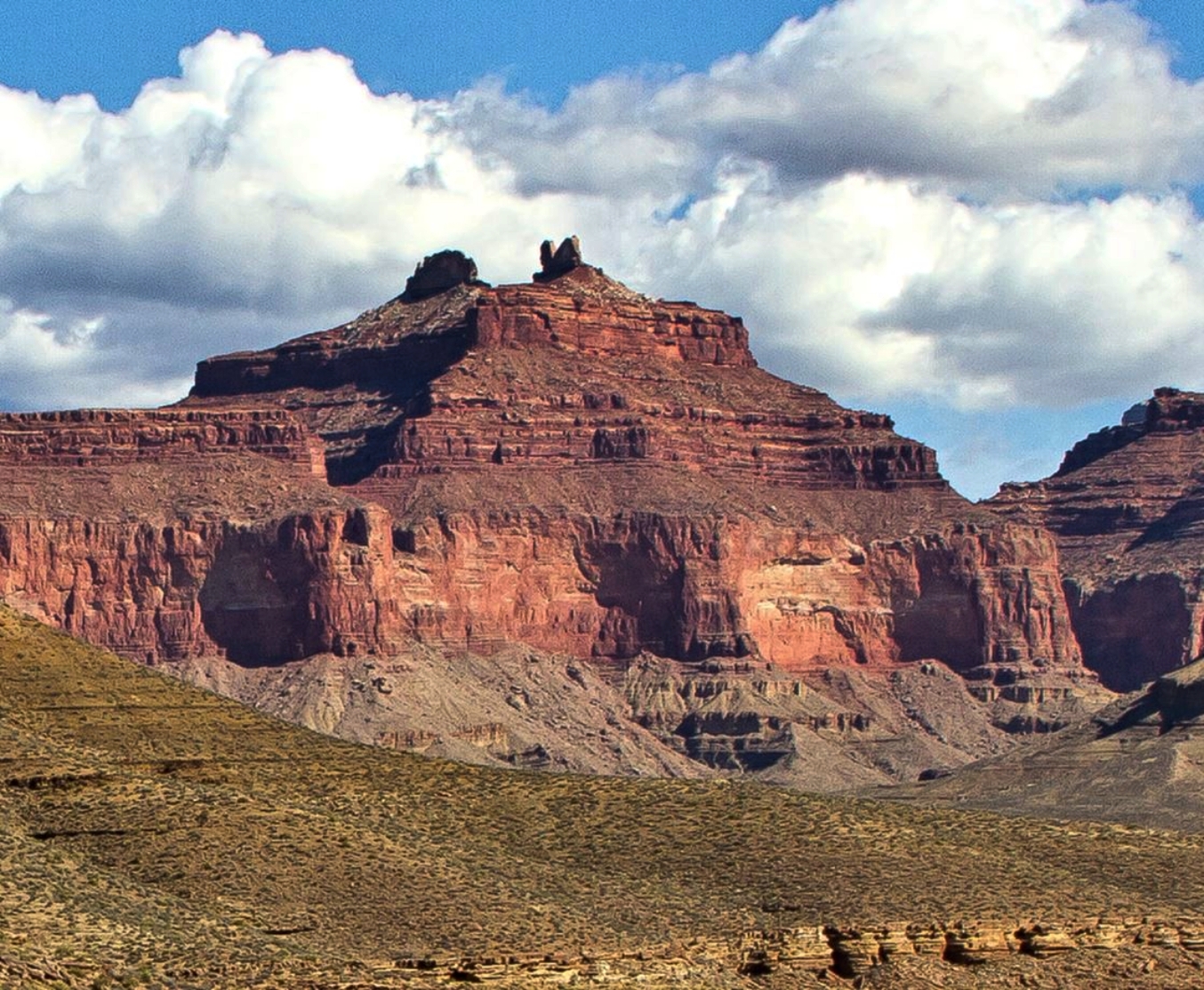
South aspect

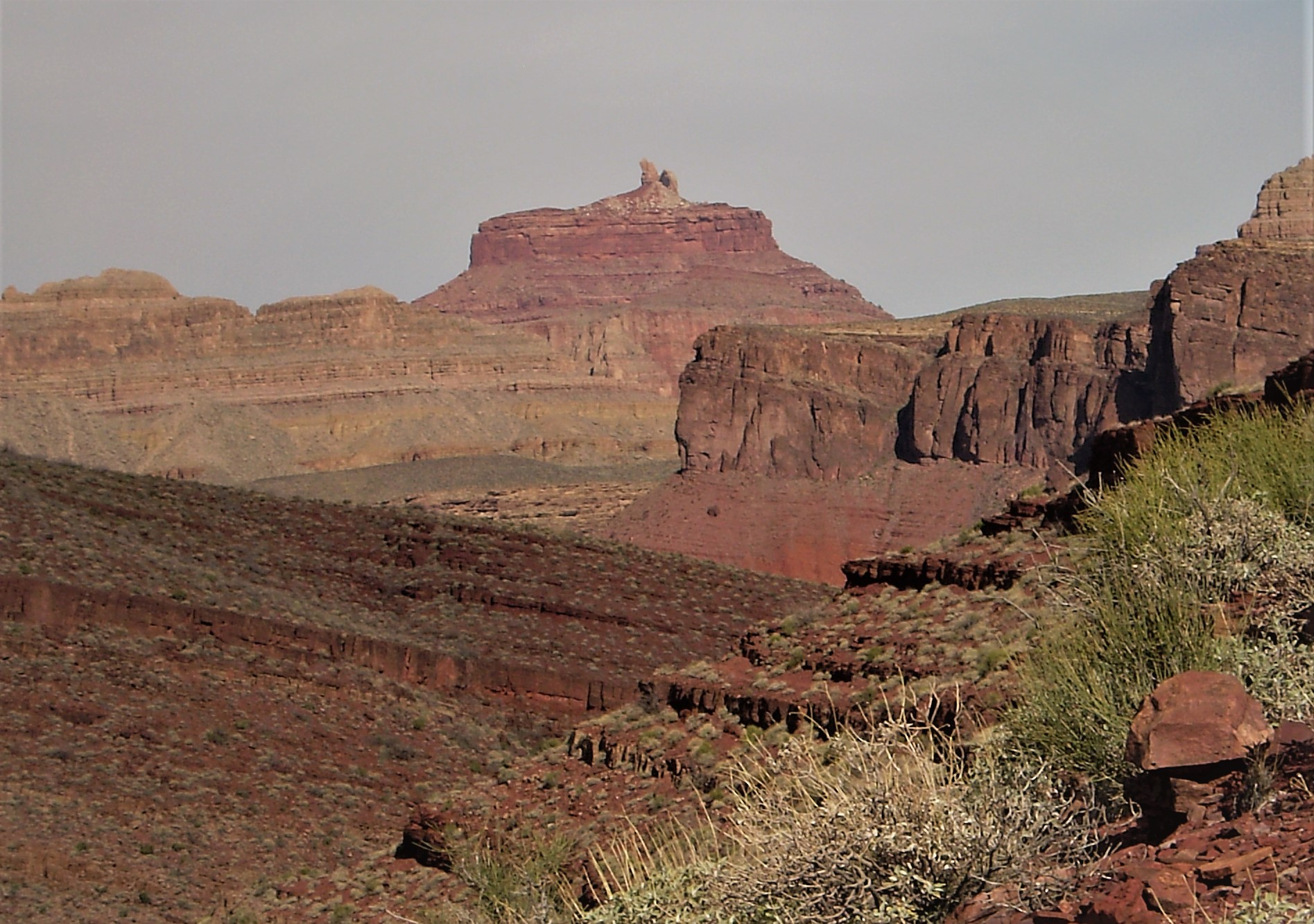
From the southeast

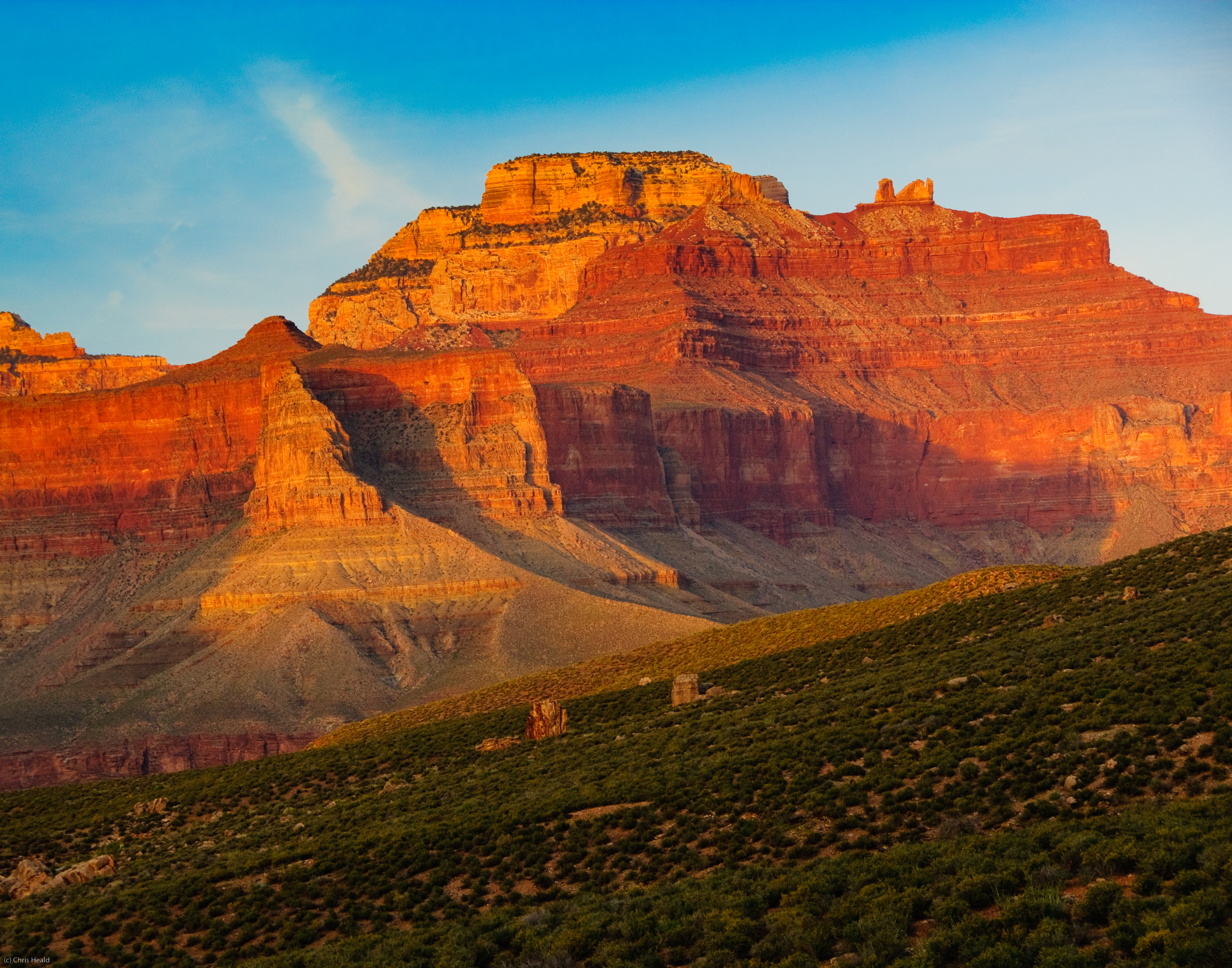
Wotans Throne behind Angels Gate

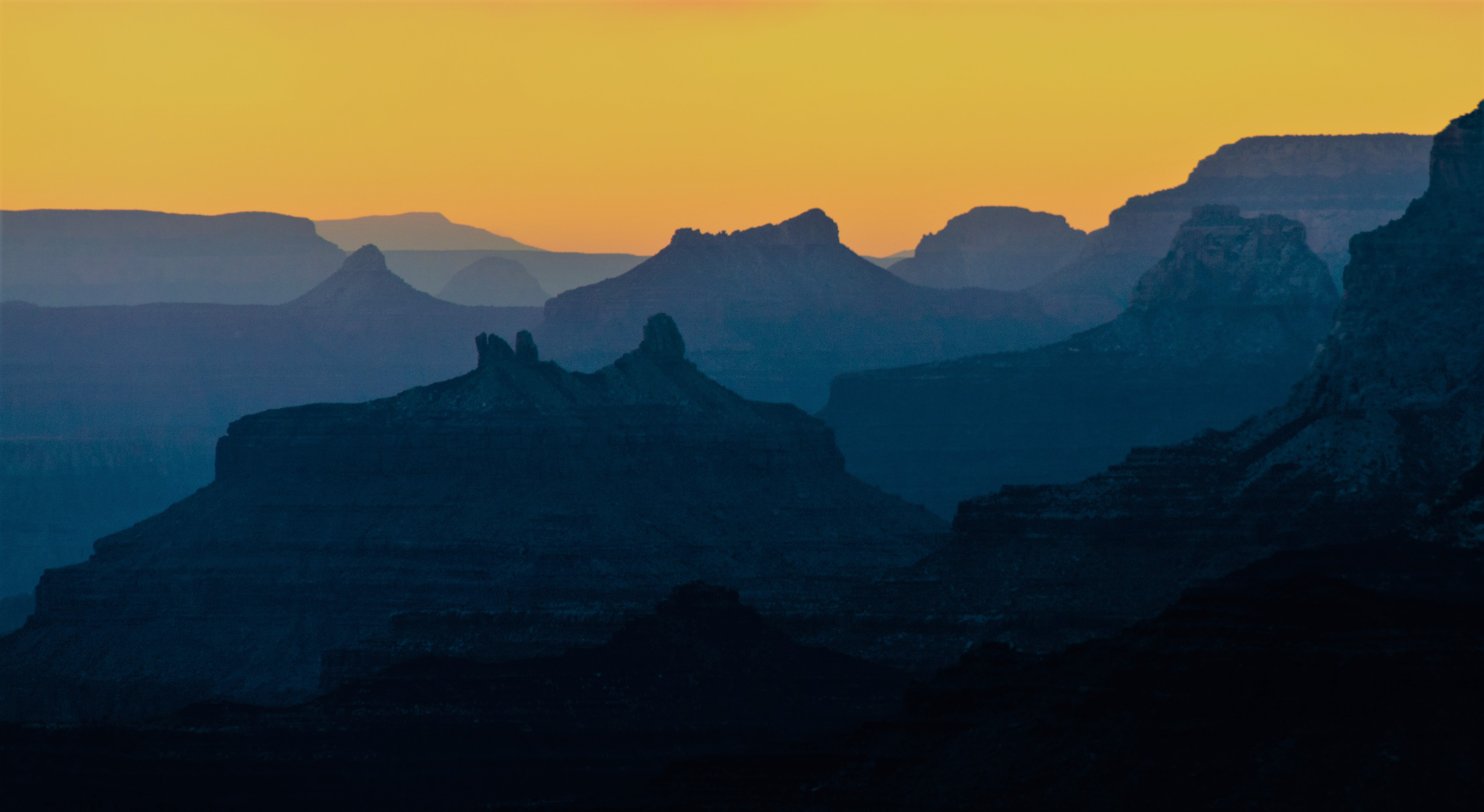
Sunset from Desert View, Angels Gate (lower left of center)

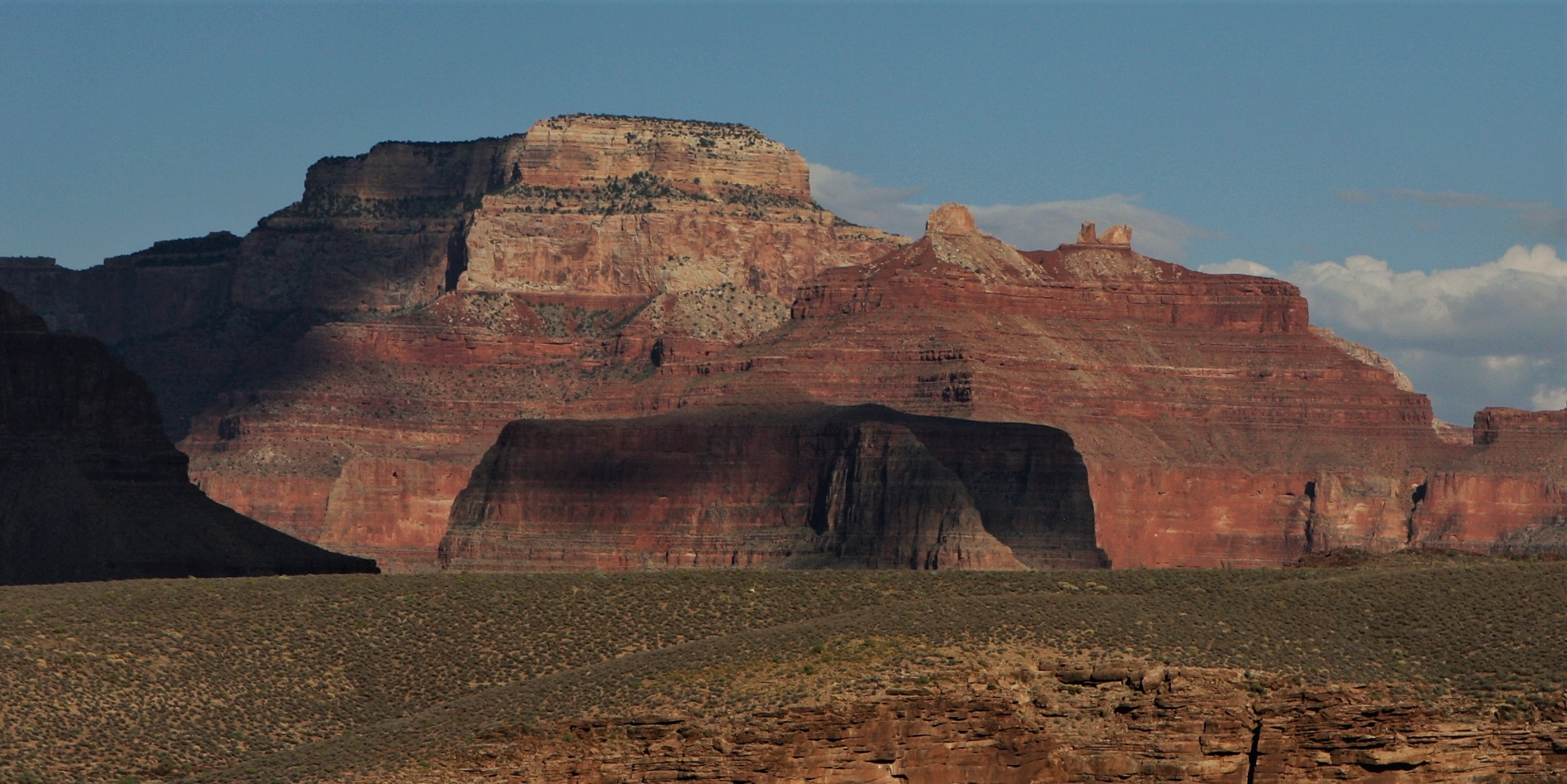
Wotans Throne (left) and Angels Gate from west on Tonto Trail

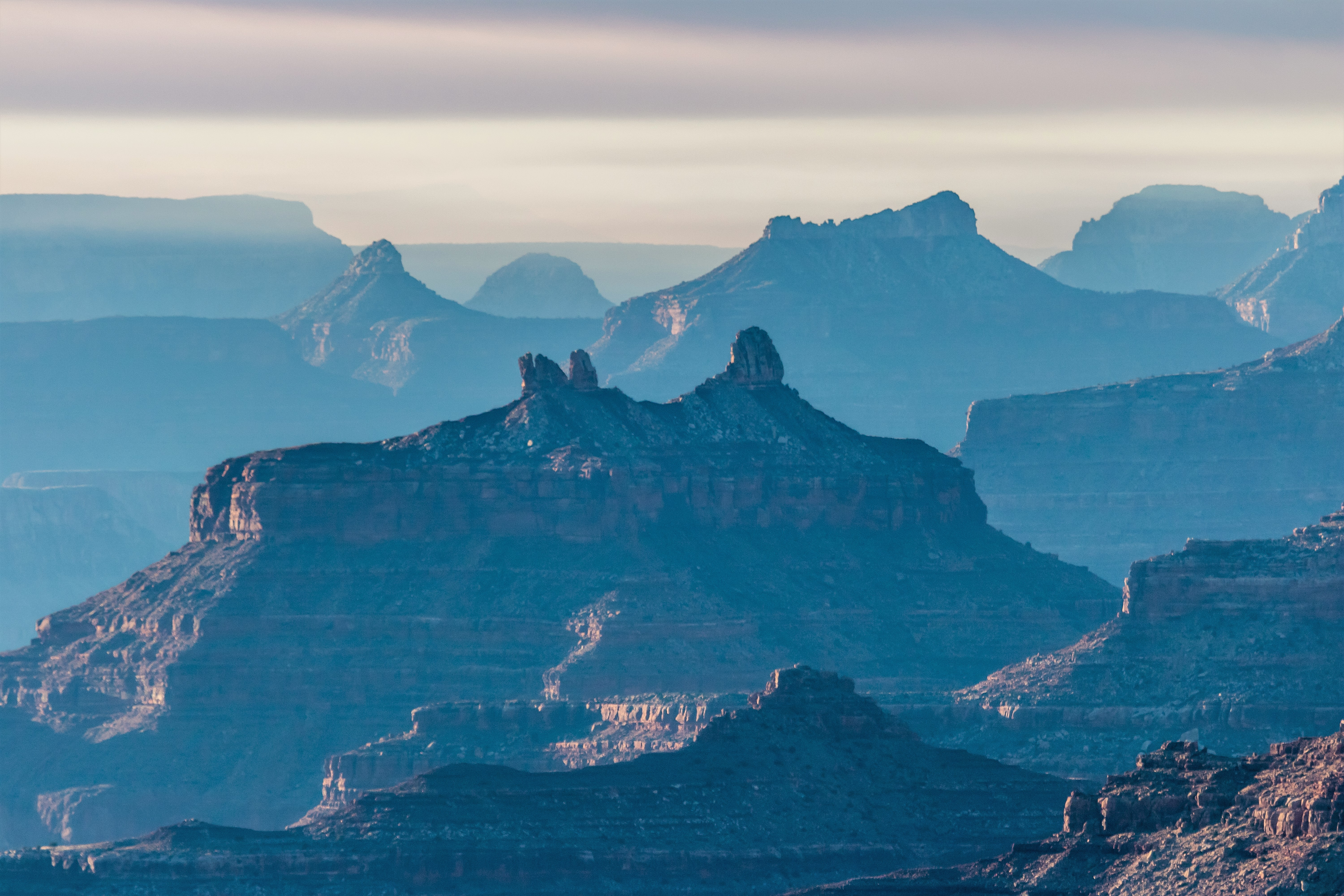
Angels Gate from Desert View

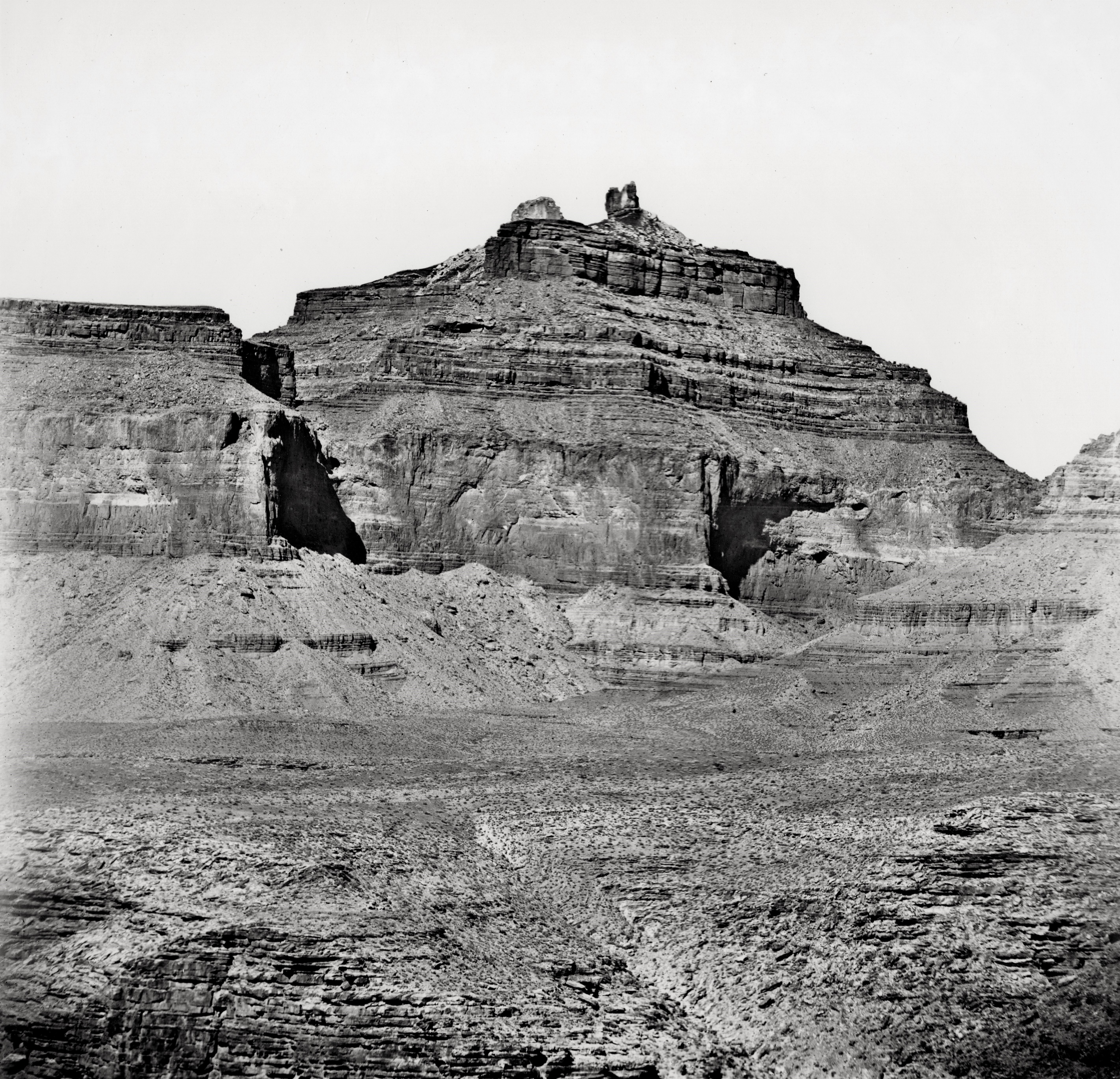
Angels Gate from south, circa 1901

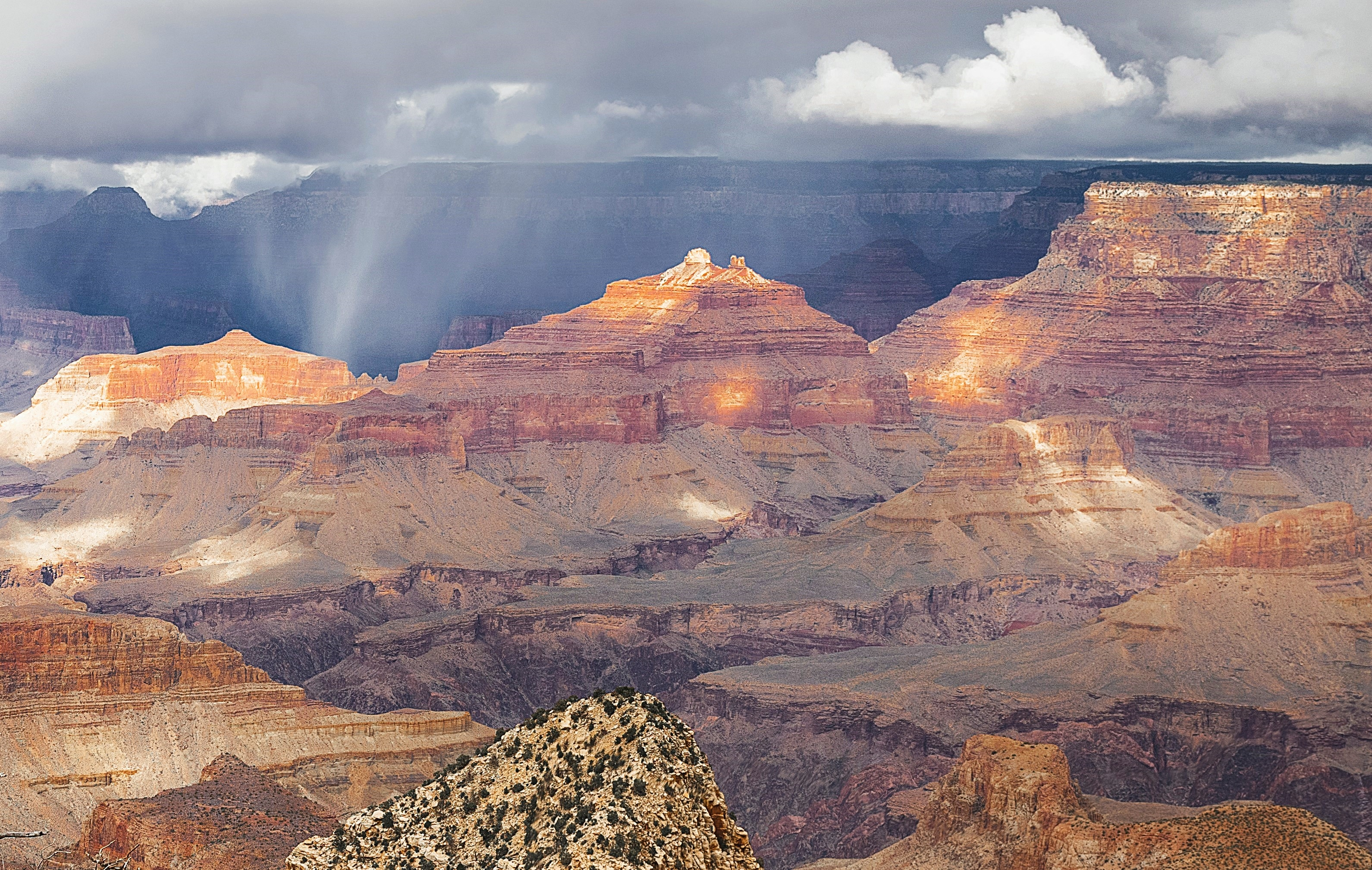
Angels Gate (centered)

== Hawkins Butte ==
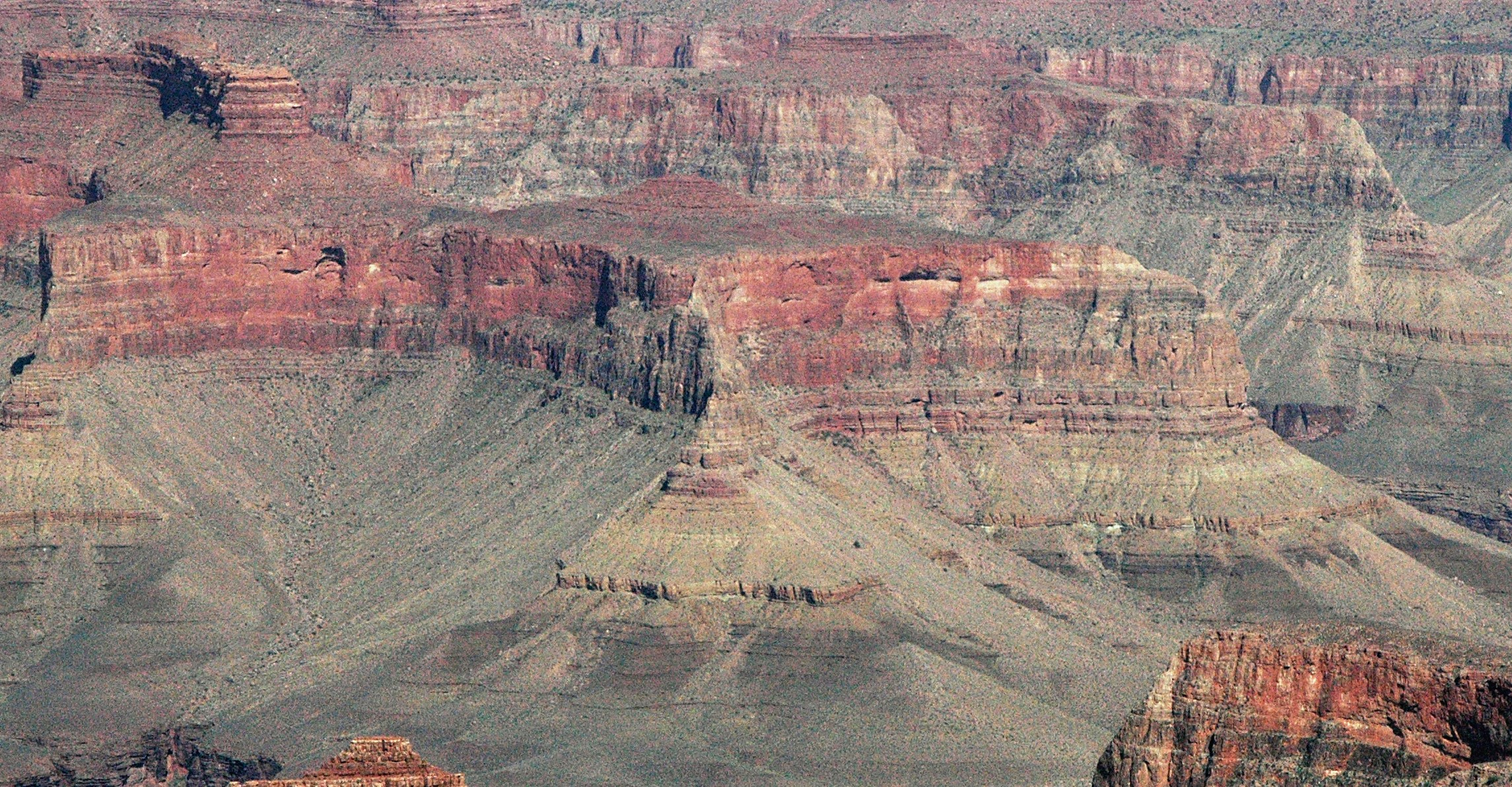
Hawkins Butte

Hawkins Butte is a 5,340-foot (1,630 m)-elevation butte attached at the southwest end of Angels Gate. It was officially named in 1932 after William "Billy" Robert Hawkins, the hunter and cook for John Wesley Powell's 1869 expedition down the Colorado River through the Grand Canyon. It is primarily composed of exposed cliffs of Redwall Limestone overlaying Tonto Group.

== See also ==
- Geology of the Grand Canyon area
- Dunn Butte
