= The Dragon (Arizona) =

Landform in the Grand Canyon, Arizona

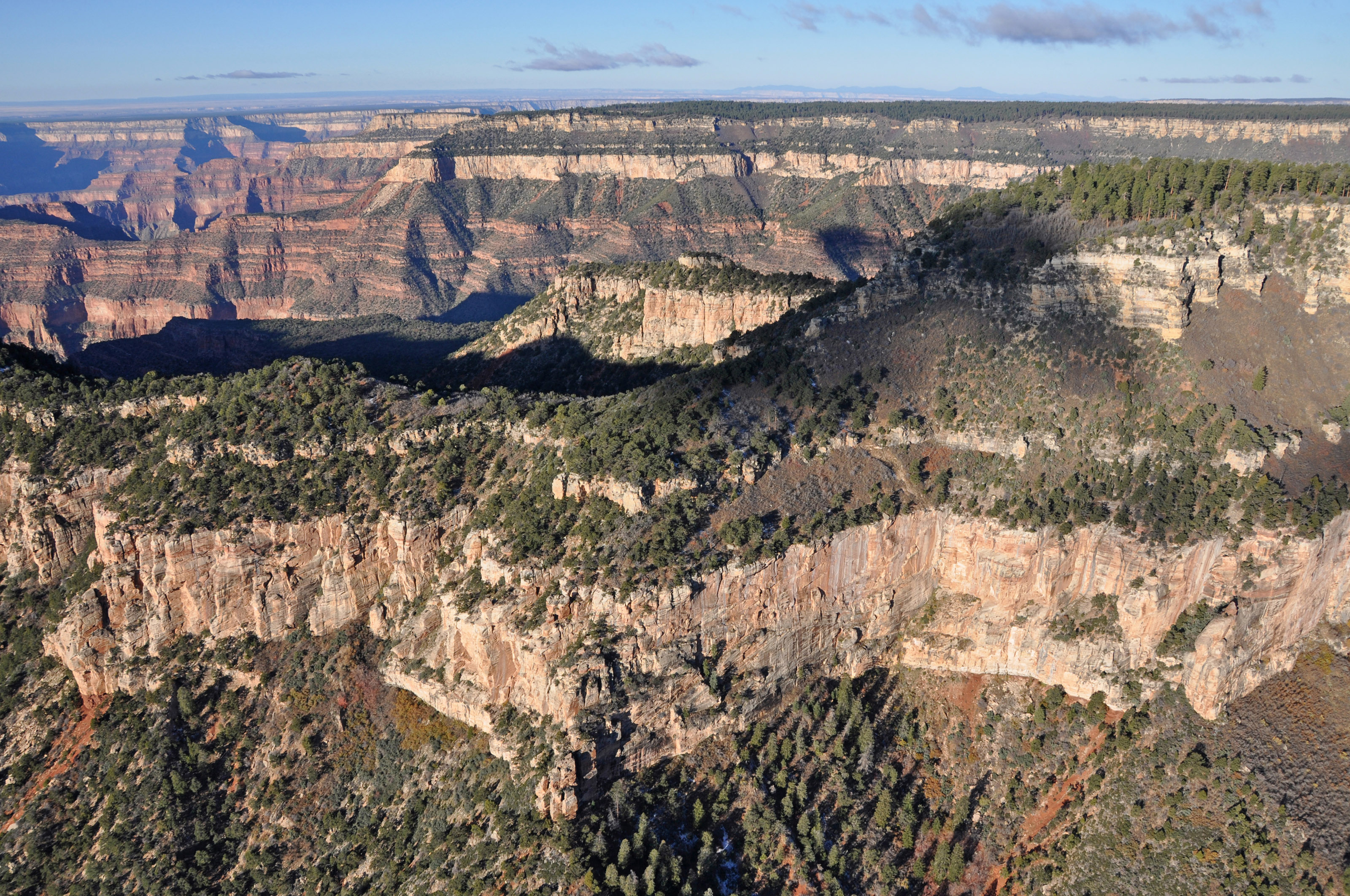
- east aspect (1/3 north region ridgeline) (upper canyon tributary of Dragon Creek)

Highest point
- Elevation: 8,105 ft (2,470 m)
- Prominence: 325 ft (99 m)
- Parent peak: Kaibab Plateau (8,701 ft)
- Coordinates: 36.2412°N 112.1728°W

Geography
- Location within Arizona Location within the United States
- Location: Grand Canyon; Coconino County, Arizona, US
- Parent range: Kaibab Plateau; Colorado Plateau
- Topo map: USGS Shiva Temple

Geology
- Mountain type: sedimentary
- Rock types: prominence-Kaibab Limestone-(forested tableland) and Kaibab Limestone, Toroweap Formation, Coconino Sandstone, Hermit Formation

The Dragon is a 8,105-foot-elevation summit located in the Grand Canyon, in Coconino County of Arizona, US. It is situated north of the Hindu Amphitheater, and about ~4.5 miles north-northwest of Shiva Temple, and ~2.5 mi north of Dragon Head. Both of the Dragon landforms are on a connected ridgeline, (Dragon Head being the ridgeline terminus), defining two south trending canyon watersheds – Dragon Creek, (east), and (Upper)-Crystal Creek (Arizona), (west).

Aerial photos of The Dragon and Dragon Head were taken as Draft Environmental Impact Statement (DEIS) studies for public flight-path routes within the entire Grand Canyon.

== Geology & biology ==
The geology of The Dragon prominence is a ~250 to 300 ft layer of cliff-forming, whitish Kaibab Limestone. Its hardness supports an approximately horizontal tableland of Ponderosa Pine forest.

Below the Kaibab is an even larger unit of the slope-forming Toroweap Formation. The slope is modestly vegetated, and has large areas of erosion debris, with no obvious interlaced cliffs. The Toroweap Formation rests upon a ~400+ ft cliff of cliff-former Coconino Sandstone.

The Coconino Sandstone (buff/(reddish-white)), rests upon a relatively massive unit of Hermit Formation (Hermit Shale). The slopes are vegetated, also with large sections of burnt-red-brown Hermit debris.
