= Dragon Head (Arizona) =

Landform in the Grand Canyon, Arizona

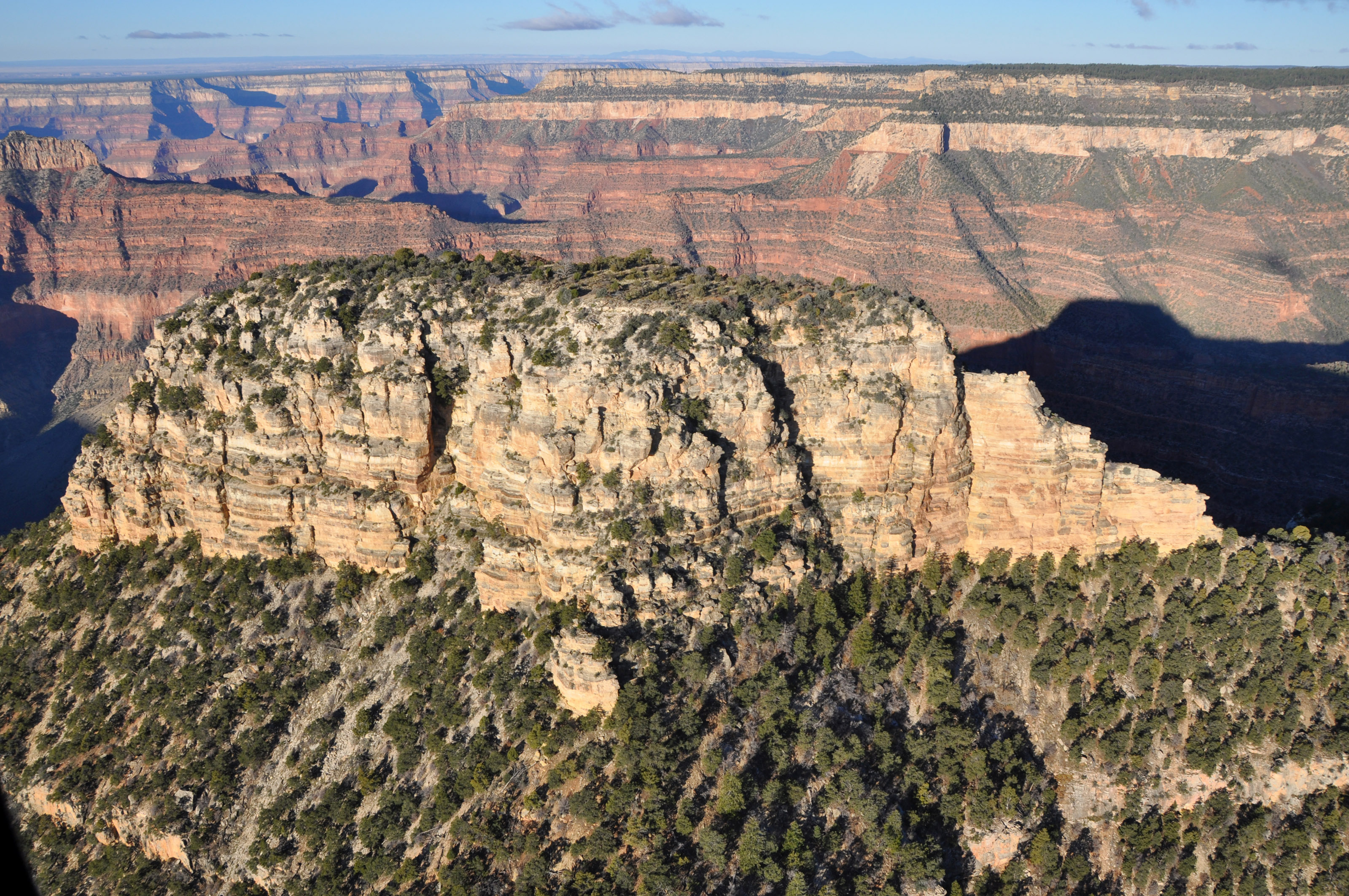
- east aspect, aerial photo (note: the flat-topped shadow)

Highest point
- Elevation: 7,765 ft (2,367 m)
- Prominence: 1,351 ft (412 m)
- Parent peak: The Dragon (Arizona)
- Coordinates: 36°11′53″N 112°10′49″W

Geography
- Location within Arizona Location within the United States
- Location: Grand Canyon; Coconino County, Arizona, US
- Parent range: Kaibab Plateau; Colorado Plateau
- Topo map: USGS Shiva Temple

Geology
- Rock age: Permian down to Cambrian
- Mountain type(s): sedimentary rock: limestone, sandstone, shale, mudstone, siltstone
- Rock types: prominence-Kaibab Limestone on slopes of Toroweap Formation, on platform of Coconino Sandstone-(note: flat-topped shadow) and Toroweap Formation-(debris), Coconino Sandstone-(platform); Hermit Shale, Supai Group-(4 units), Redwall Limestone-(cliff), Tonto Group-(3 units); 3_Muav Limestone-(short platform/cliff), 2_Bright Angel Shale-(forested/vegetated)

Dragon Head (Arizona) is a 7,766-foot (2,367 m) elevation summit located in the Grand Canyon, in Coconino County of Arizona, US. It is situated in the north of the Hindu Amphitheater, ~2.0 miles west of Shiva Temple, and ~2.5 mi southeast of Grama Point (northeast of Point Sublime). Unlike the extensive Ponderosa Pine forest of Shiva Temple, tableland/plateau prominence, Dragon Head’s flat-topped (minor plateau), is only populated with a marginal non-Ponderosa forest. Shiva Temple is approximately 275 acres (0.43 mi^{2}), where Dragon Head is an ~5 acre prominence platform.

== Geology & Forests ==
The lightly forested horizontal platform of Dragon Head, is created because of the debris from the eroded platform of the cliff-former, Kaibab Limestone. (Cliff formers also produce platforms.) Below the Kaibab are slopes of the Toroweap Formation, on the shorter cliff of Coconino Sandstone, upon eroded slopes of Hermit Shale. The shale sits on the four units of the Supai Group, a colorful deep-orange-red, and layered by units 2 and 4 as cliffs, and units 1 and 3 as eroded slopes. The Kaibab-prominence platform created (~north-south), is caused because of the hardness of the Kaibab Limestone. Peakery.com states the prominence as 520 ft (158 m), which refers to the Kaibab Limestone and Toroweap Formation slope; the peakbagger prominence includes the rock layers below the Kaibab.

The Kaibab Limestone rests on an extensive slope of slope-forming Toroweap Formation, which is more heavily forested than the Kaibab Limestone platform, (and the Toroweap slope-debris – is only sparsely visible between the forested trees; The Dragon (Arizona) is northwards, and upstream/upcanyon in the Hindu Amphitheater and closer to the forested-North Rim). The ridgeline that Dragon Head sits on is a mostly north-south ridge, and it is a heavily-forested platform of the cliff-former Coconino Sandstone.

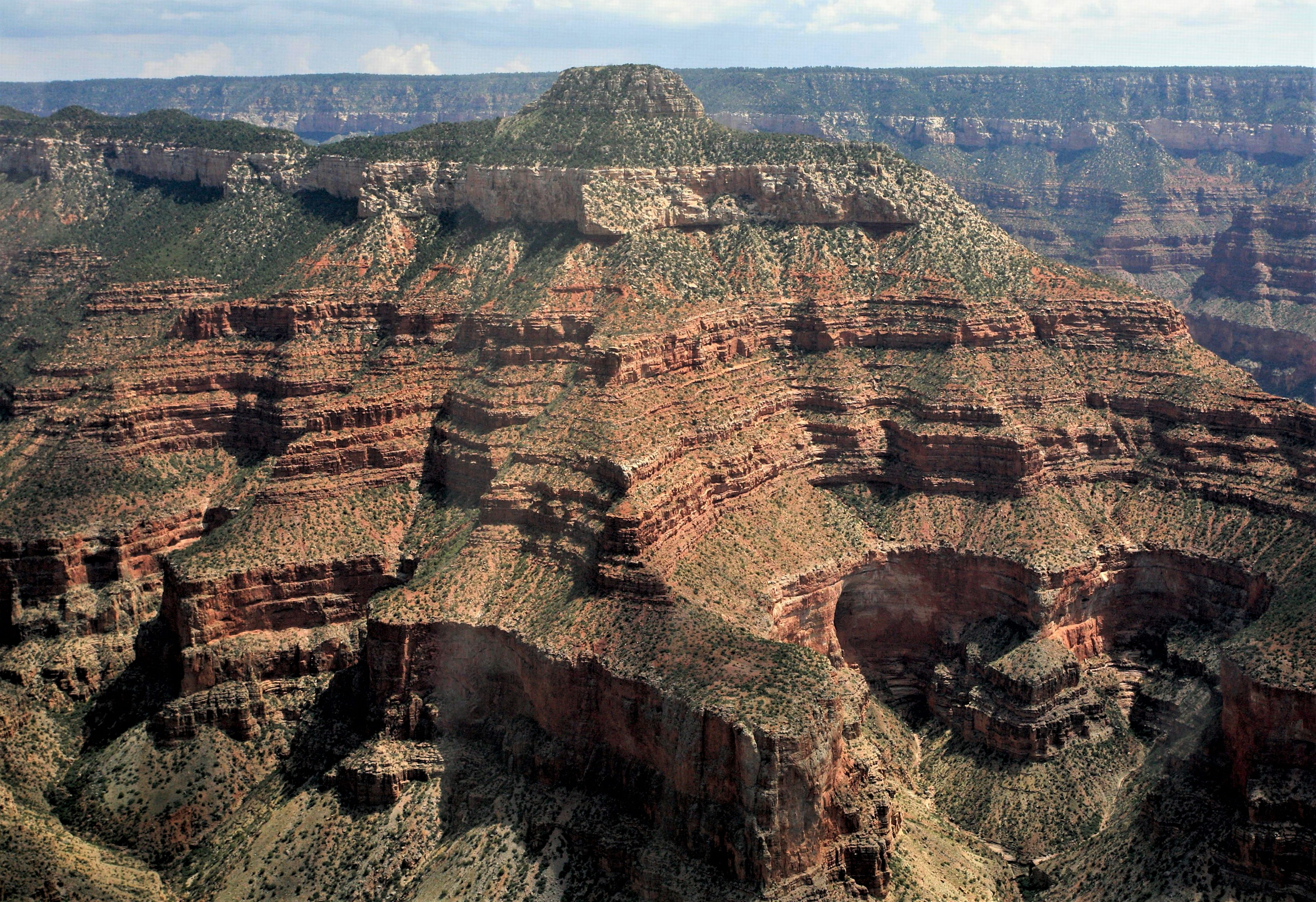
West aspect (The horizontal ridgeline, (platform of Coconino Sandstone), can be seen extending northwards.)

The location of Dragon Head (miles north of the Colorado River, and closer to the North Rim), leaves it in a forested region. The parts of the Dragon Head landform that are not moderately vegetated – are the cliffs, and even some cliffs have partial vegetation (especially the eroded/fractured Kaibab Limestone prominence).

The cliff sequence top (youngest) to oldest is as follows:
Kaibab Limestone
Coconino Sandstone
Esplanade Sandstone (Supai unit 4)
Manakacha Formation (Supai unit 2)
Redwall Limestone
Muav Limestone (short platform & cliff)
all sitting on slopes of dull-greenish Bright Angel Shale.

== Ext links ==
- Aerial view, Dragon Head, Mountainzone
- Dragon Head photo, peakery.com (the prominence, and the extensive ridgeline)
