= Atoko Point =

Landform in the Grand Canyon, Arizona

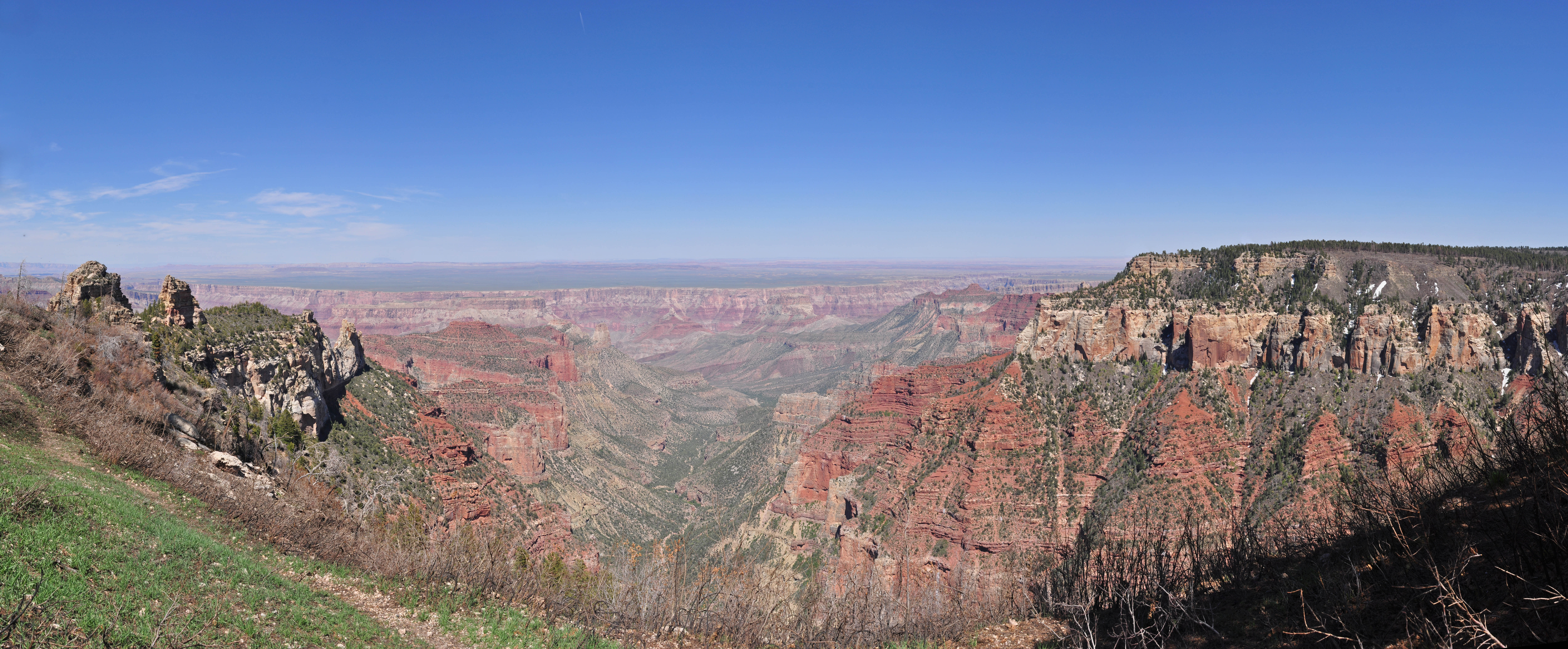
- Kwagunt Canyon, Atoko Point (right)

Highest point
- Elevation: 8,382 ft (2,555 m)
- Prominence: 50 ft (15 m)
- Parent peak: prominence 8442 ft
- Isolation: 0.5 mi (0.80 km)
- Coordinates: 36.2113831°N 111.9334981°W

Geography
- Location within Arizona Location within the United States
- Location: Grand Canyon National Park, (Walhalla Plateau); Coconino County, Arizona, US
- Parent range: Kaibab Plateau (Walhalla Plateau); Colorado Plateau
- Topo map: USGS Walhalla Plateau

Geology
- Rock age: Permian
- Mountain type: sedimentary rock: limestone-(prominence-cliff)
- Rock type: Kaibab Limestone

Atoko Point is a 8,382 ft-cliff-elevation Point located in the eastern Grand Canyon, Coconino County of northern Arizona, United States. It is about 6.5 miles south-southeast of the northernmost point on the east of the North Rim (Point Imperial), but most of the points south, are on the East Rim (or South Rim) of the sub-plateau, the Walhalla Plateau. Atoko Point is 1.3 miles southeast of Roosevelt Point, and also 2.6 miles southeast of the Vista Encantada viewpoint. Two headwater canyons of Upper Kwagunt Creek and Canyon bisect around Atoko Point, and drain east to the south-flowing Colorado River, about 6.5 miles east, in the southernmost stretch of Marble Canyon. Atoko Point lies about one mile east of the Cape Royal Road.

The cliff of Atoko Point is composed of Kaibab Limestone, upon Toroweap Formation, on white cliffs of Coconino Sandstone. Below is soft erodible, dk-burnt red Hermit Shale, on bright-red-orange Supai Group layers (4 units).

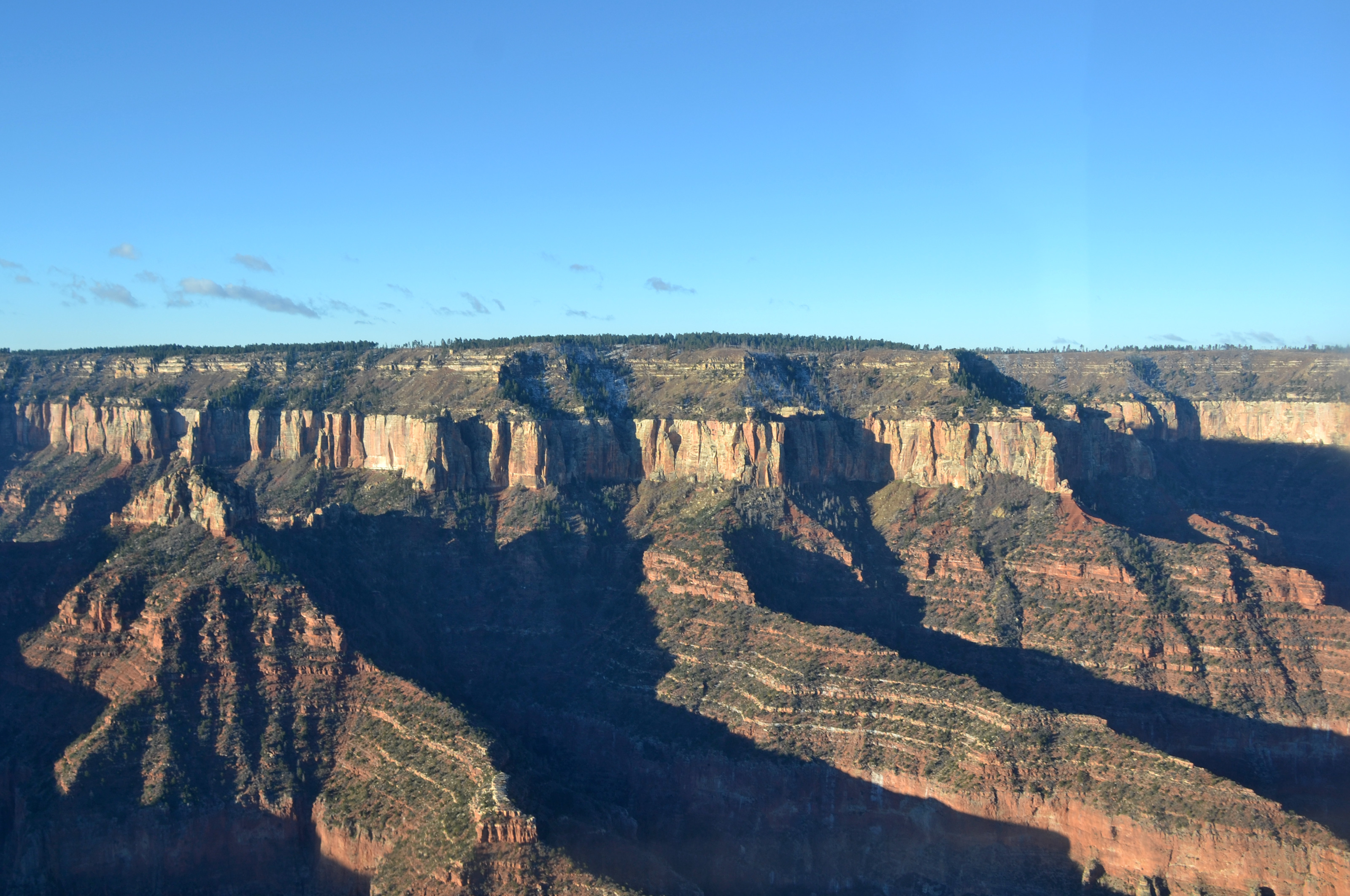
