= Zoroaster Temple =

Landform in Coconino County, Arizona

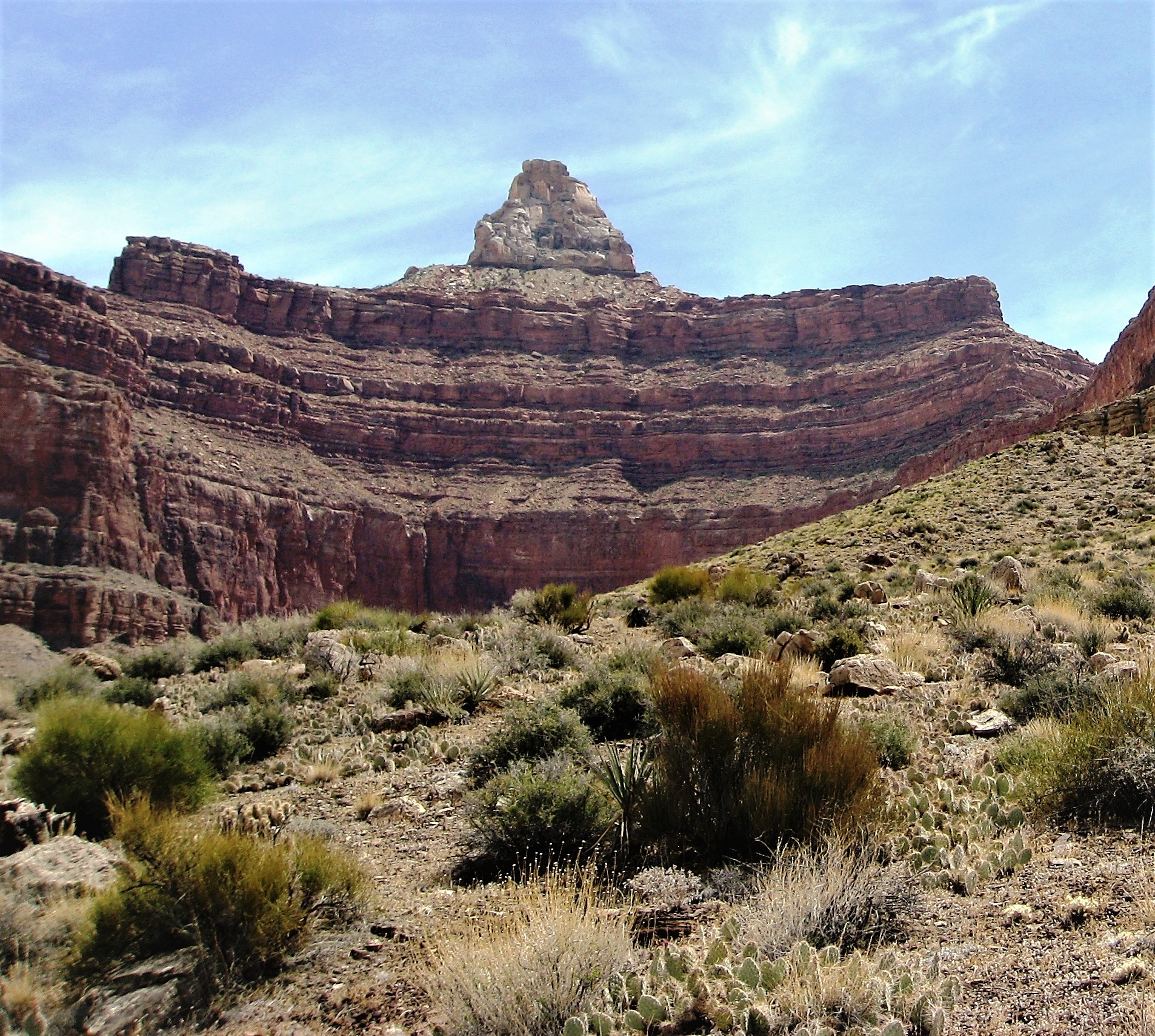
- Southwest aspect

Highest point
- Elevation: 7,123 ft (2,171 m)
- Prominence: 763 ft (233 m)
- Parent peak: Brahma Temple (7,551 ft)
- Isolation: 0.88 mi (1.42 km)
- Coordinates: 36°07′08″N 112°02′43″W

Geography
- Location within Arizona Location within the United States
- Country: United States
- State: Arizona
- County: Coconino
- Protected area: Grand Canyon National Park
- Parent range: Kaibab Plateau; Colorado Plateau
- Topo map: USGS Phantom Ranch

Geology
- Rock type: Coconino Sandstone

Climbing
- First ascent: 1958
- Easiest route: class 5.7 climbing

Zoroaster Temple is a 7,123-foot-elevation (2,171-meter) summit located in the Grand Canyon, in Coconino County of Arizona, USA. It is situated 5.5 miles (8.9 km) northeast of the Yavapai Point overlook on the canyon's North Rim, from which it can be seen towering over 4,600 feet (1,400 meters) above the Colorado River and Granite Gorge. Its nearest higher neighbor is Brahma Temple, less than one mile to the north-northeast. Zoroaster Temple is named for Zoroaster, an ancient Iranian prophet. This name was used by George Wharton James and Clarence Dutton. Dutton began the tradition of naming geographical features in the Grand Canyon after mythological deities. This geographical feature's name was officially adopted in 1906 by the U.S. Board on Geographic Names.

The first ascent of the summit was made by Rick Tidrick and Dave Ganci in September 1958 via the NE Arete (class 5.9+). In 2015 they recounted the climb in an oral history. Other climbing routes include Screaming Sky Crack (class 5.11a FA 1994), and SE Face, a challenging class 5.11+ route that was first climbed in 2012. The 1958 Zoroaster ascent was the first technical climb in the Grand Canyon, transforming the Grand Canyon into a climbing mecca and setting off a rush to climb the many summits. According to the Köppen climate classification system, Zoroaster Temple is located in a Cold semi-arid climate zone.

== Geology ==
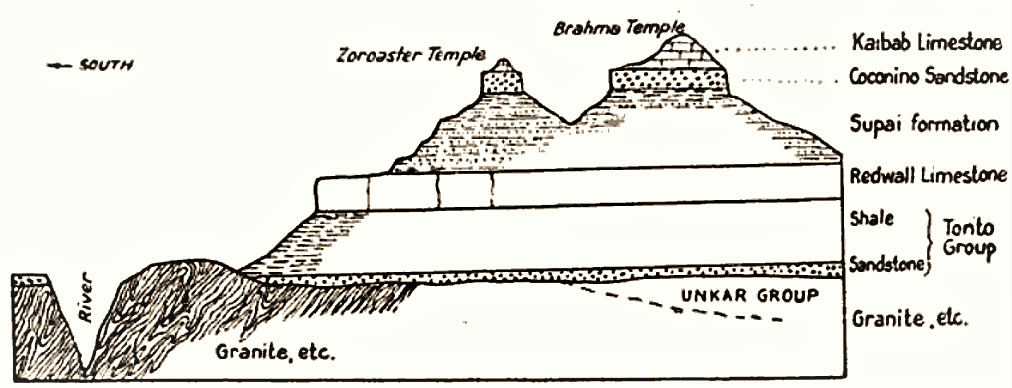
sandstone, unit-1, labeled in Tonto Group

The summit spire of Zoroaster Temple is composed of cream-colored, cliff-forming, Permian Coconino Sandstone with a small, remnant Kaibab Limestone and Toroweap Formation caprock. The sandstone, which is the third-youngest of the strata in the Grand Canyon, was deposited 265 million years ago as sand dunes. Below the Coconino Sandstone is slope-forming, Permian Hermit Formation, which in turn overlays the Pennsylvanian-Permian Supai Group. Further down are strata of Mississippian Redwall Limestone, Cambrian Tonto Group, and finally granite of the Paleoproterozoic Vishnu Basement Rocks at river level. Precipitation runoff from this feature drains south into the Colorado River via Zoroaster and Bright Angel Canyons.

=== Tonto Group and Vishnu Basement Rocks ===
The 3-unit Tonto Group rests on the Tonto Platform and is part of the Great Unconformity, expressed in many parts of the Grand Canyon. (The horizontal platform is the location of the Tonto Trail, extensive on the south side of Granite Gorge.)

The 3-unit Tonto Group has the lowest/base unit of highly resistant cliff-forming, typically short height Tapeats Sandstone. It is the contact layer with the Vishnu Basement Rocks below.

The majority thickness of the Tonto Group, is the slope-forming and commonly colorful dull-greenish Bright Angel Shale. The Shale slopes are below the 3rd unit, which sits as a short, resistant cliff at the base of the massive cliffs of the Redwall Limestone, the Muav Limestone.

== Sumner Butte ==
Sumner Butte is a notable 5,126-foot-elevation geographical feature at the end of Zoroaster Temple's long west arm. With a prominence of only 106 feet it does not meet the criteria of a stand-alone summit, but does have a striking southwest face as it towers over 2,500 feet above Phantom Ranch at the confluence of the Colorado River and Bright Angel Creek. It is named for Jack Sumner (1840–1907), head boatman for John Wesley Powell's 1869 expedition down the Colorado River through the Grand Canyon.

== Gallery ==
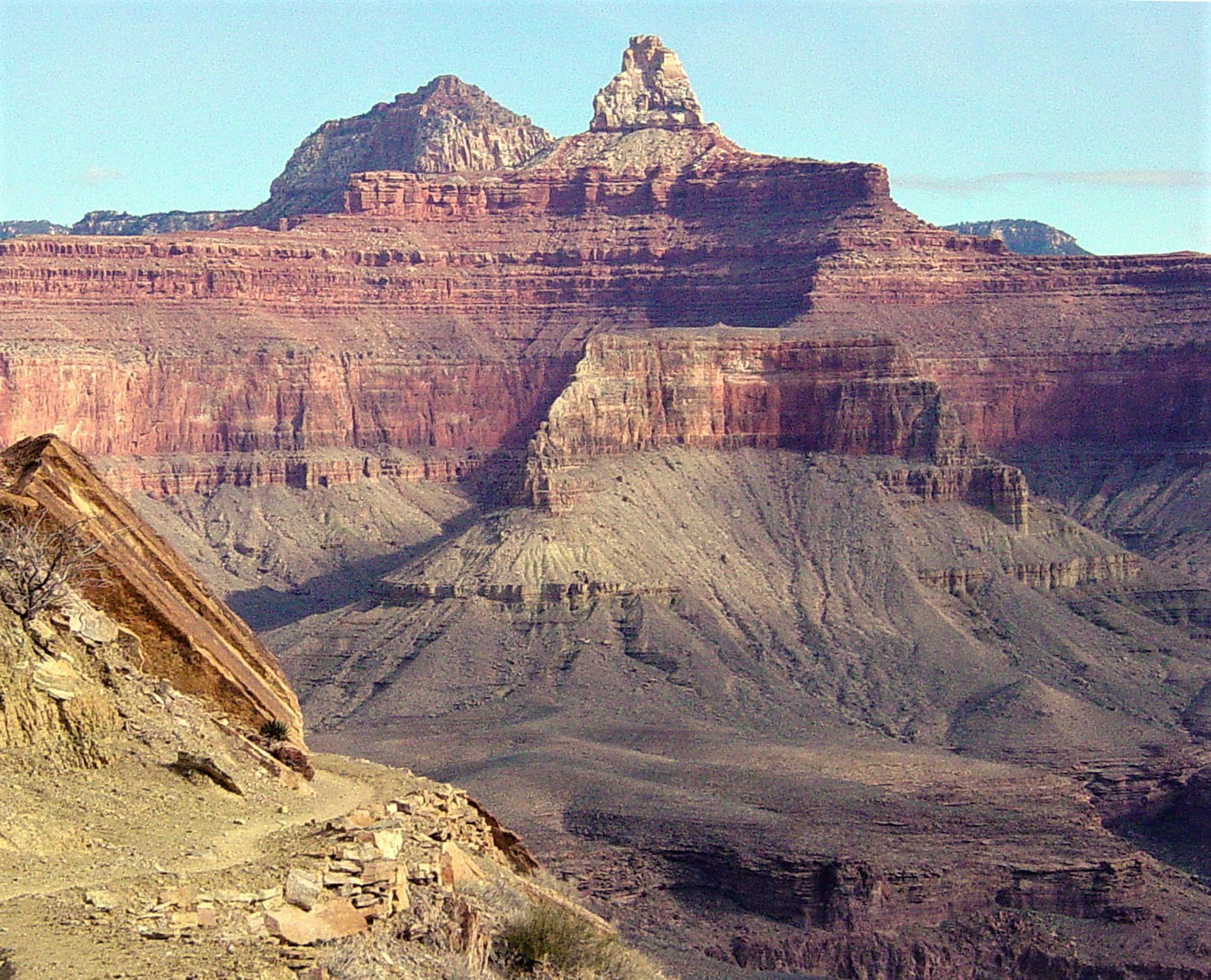
Zoroaster from South Kaibab Trail

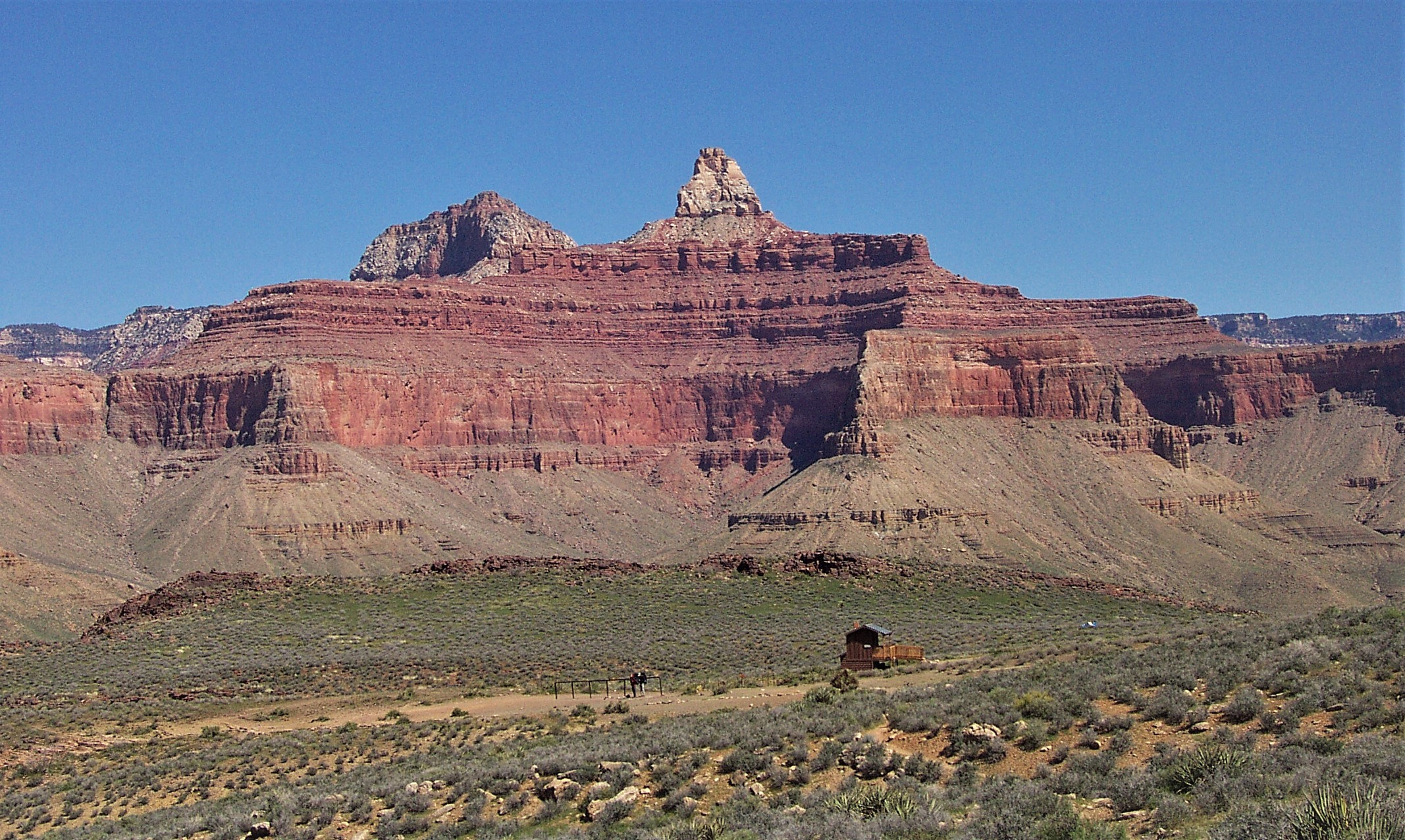

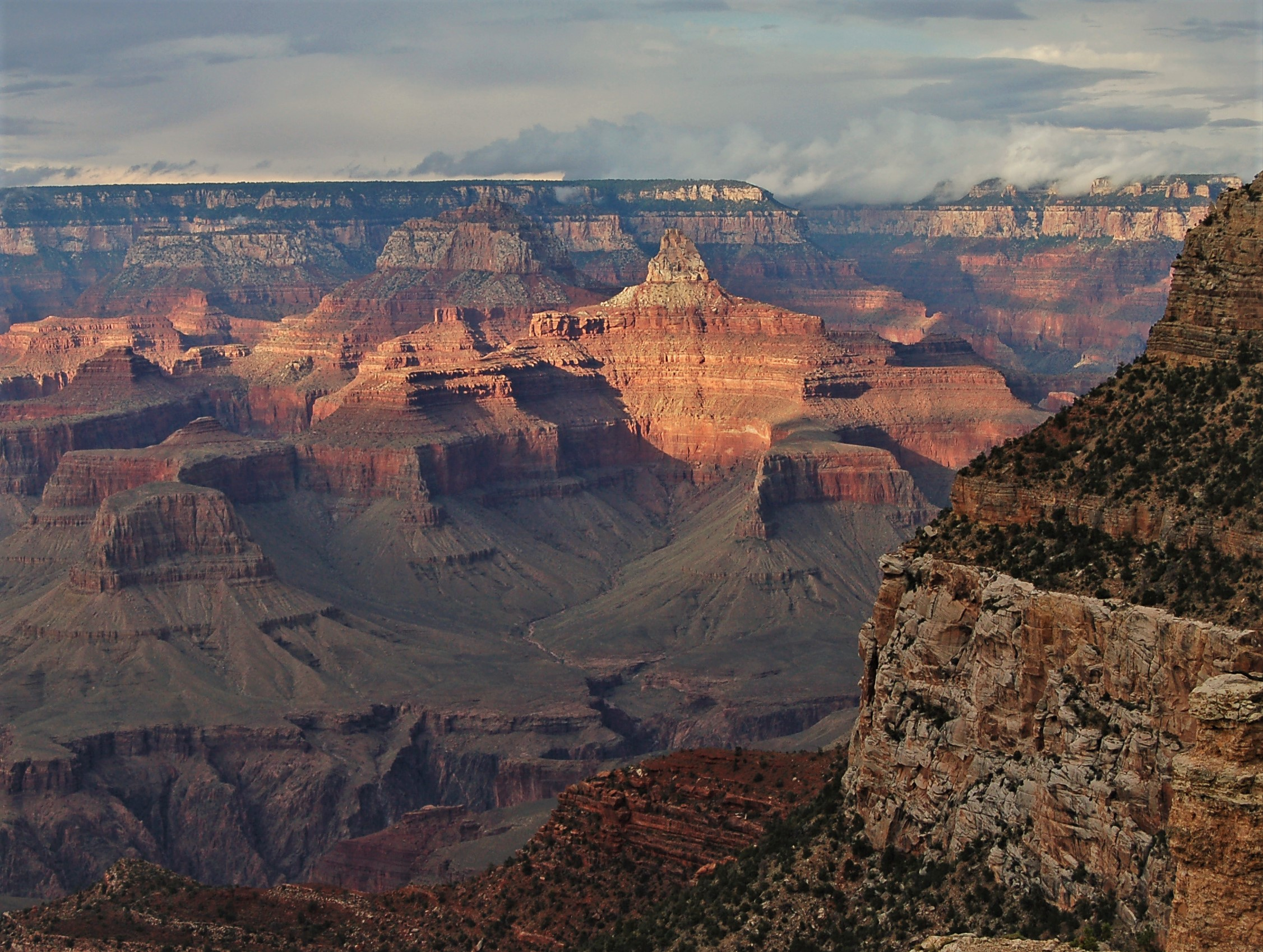

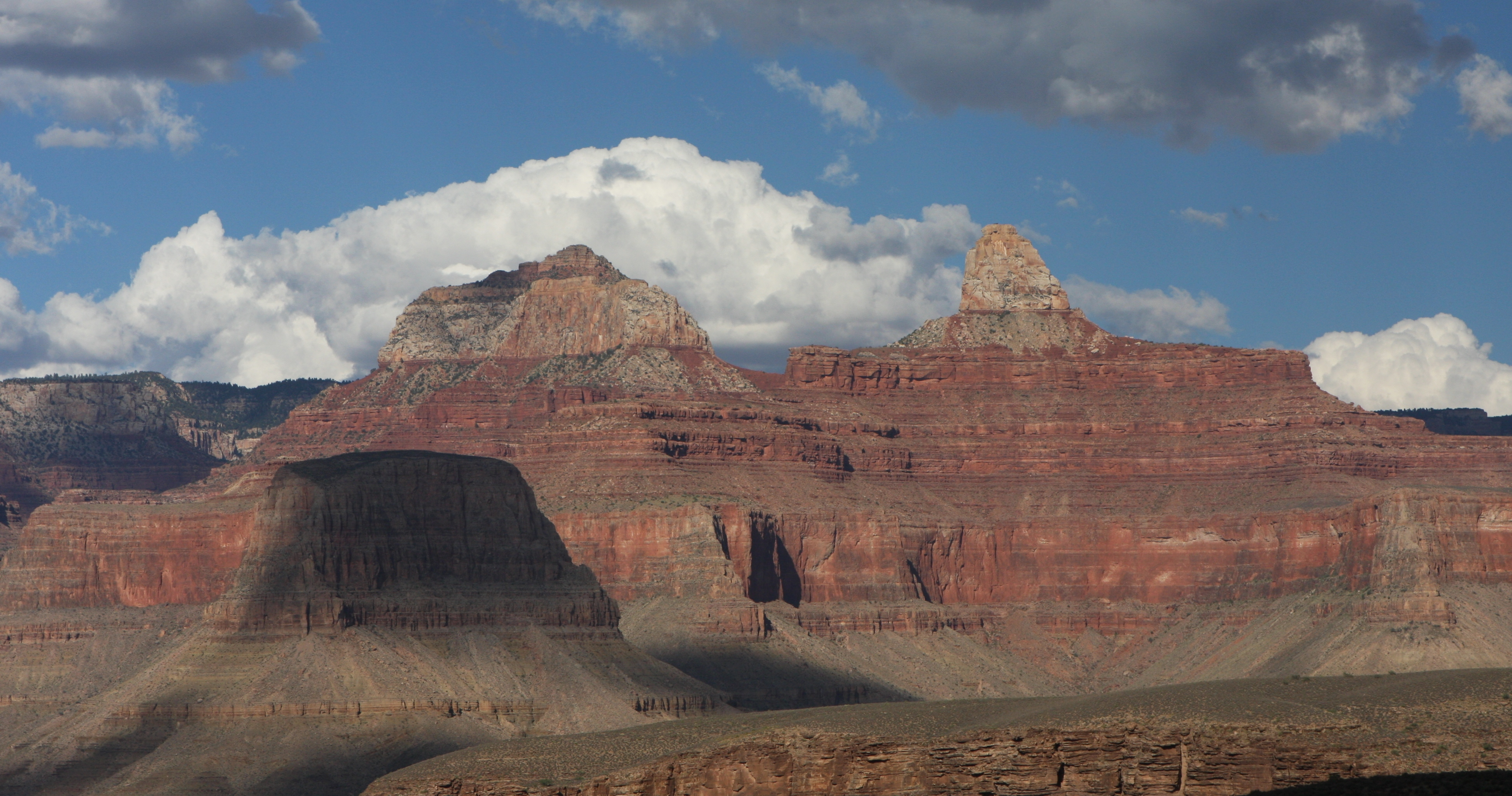
Brahma Temple (left) and Zoroaster Temple (right), from southwest
(Sumner Butte, shaded, in lower left)

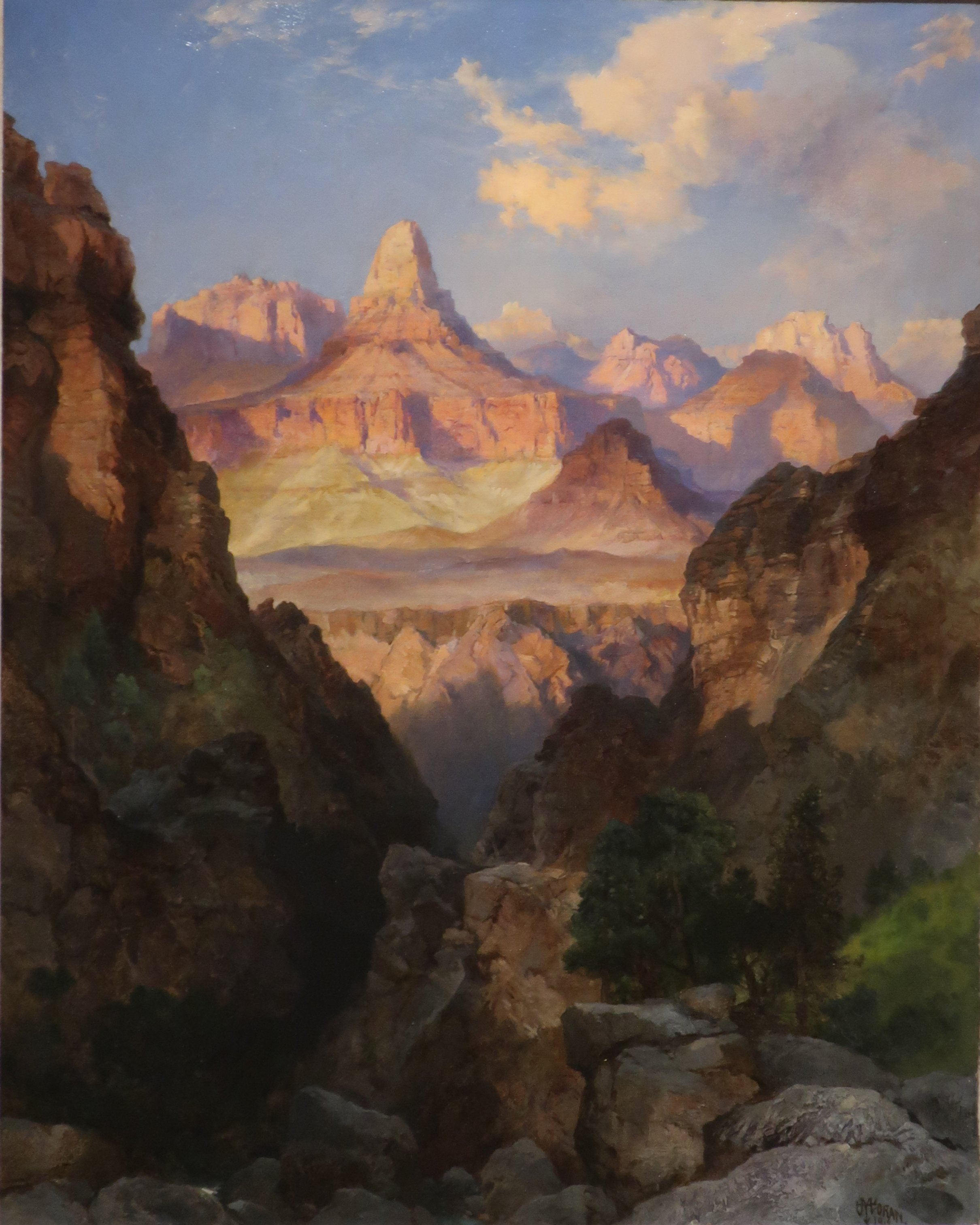
Zoroaster Temple, oil on canvas by Thomas Moran

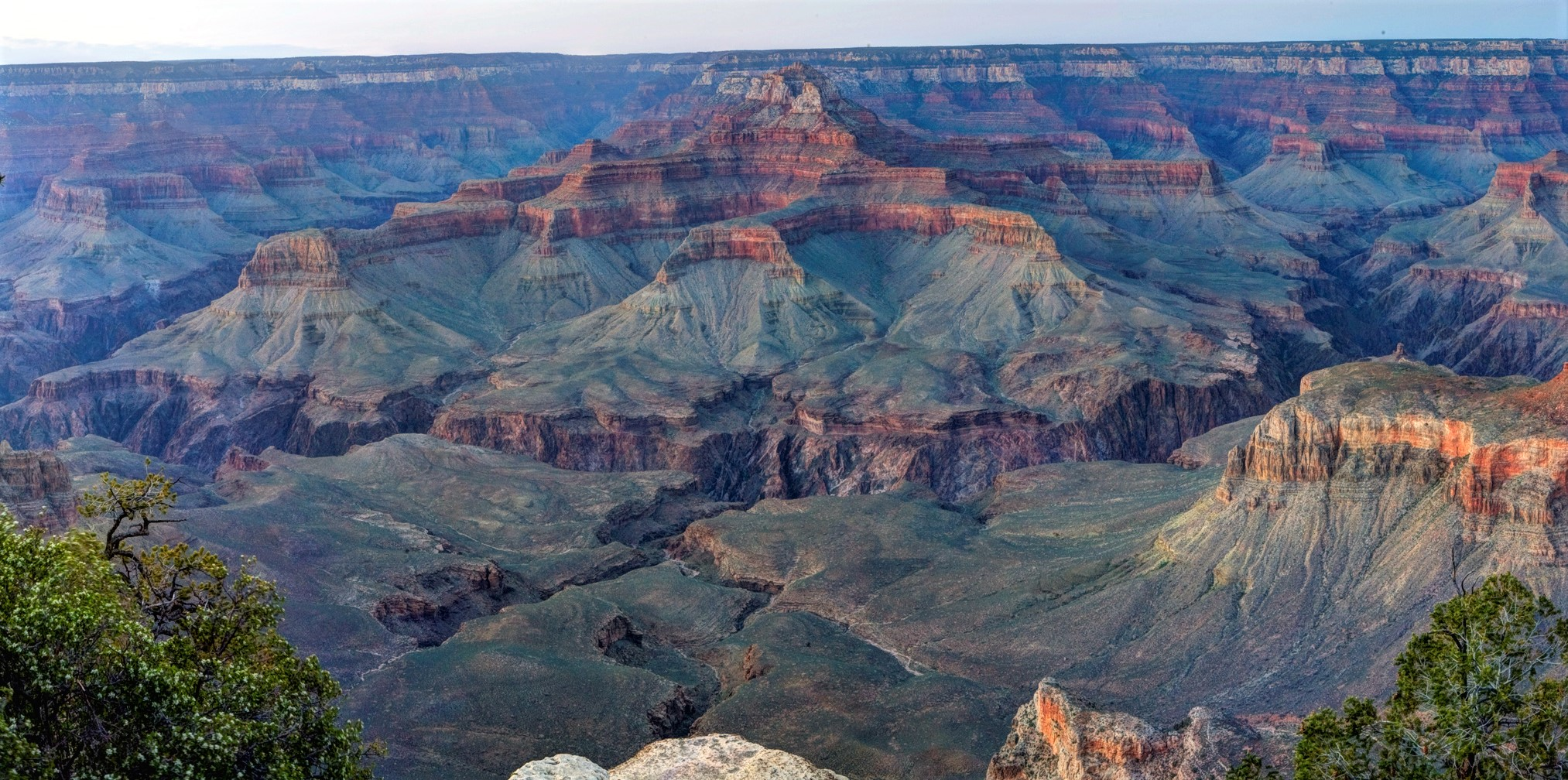
Zoroaster Temple and Granite Gorge

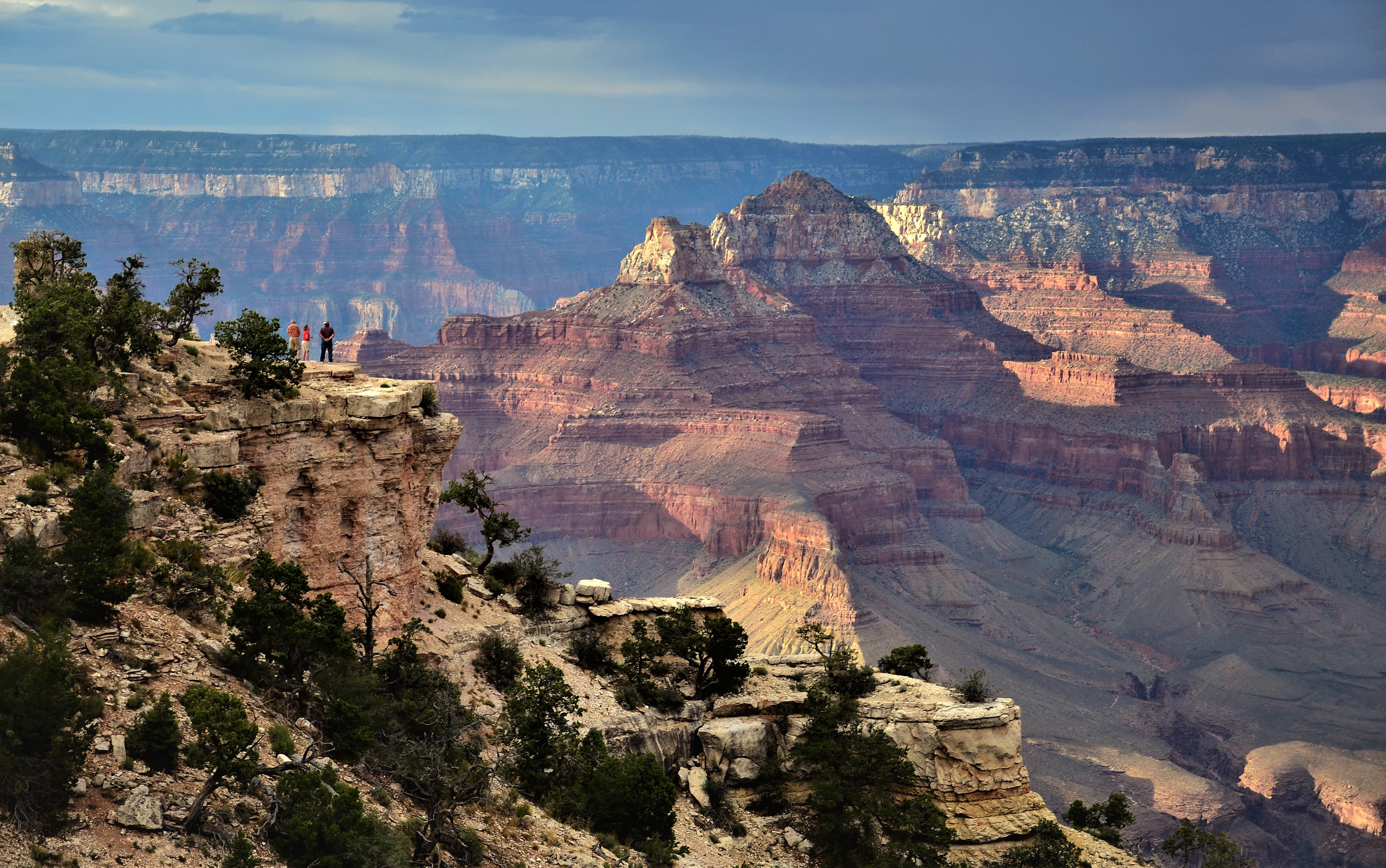
Zoroaster and Brahma Temples from Shoshone Point

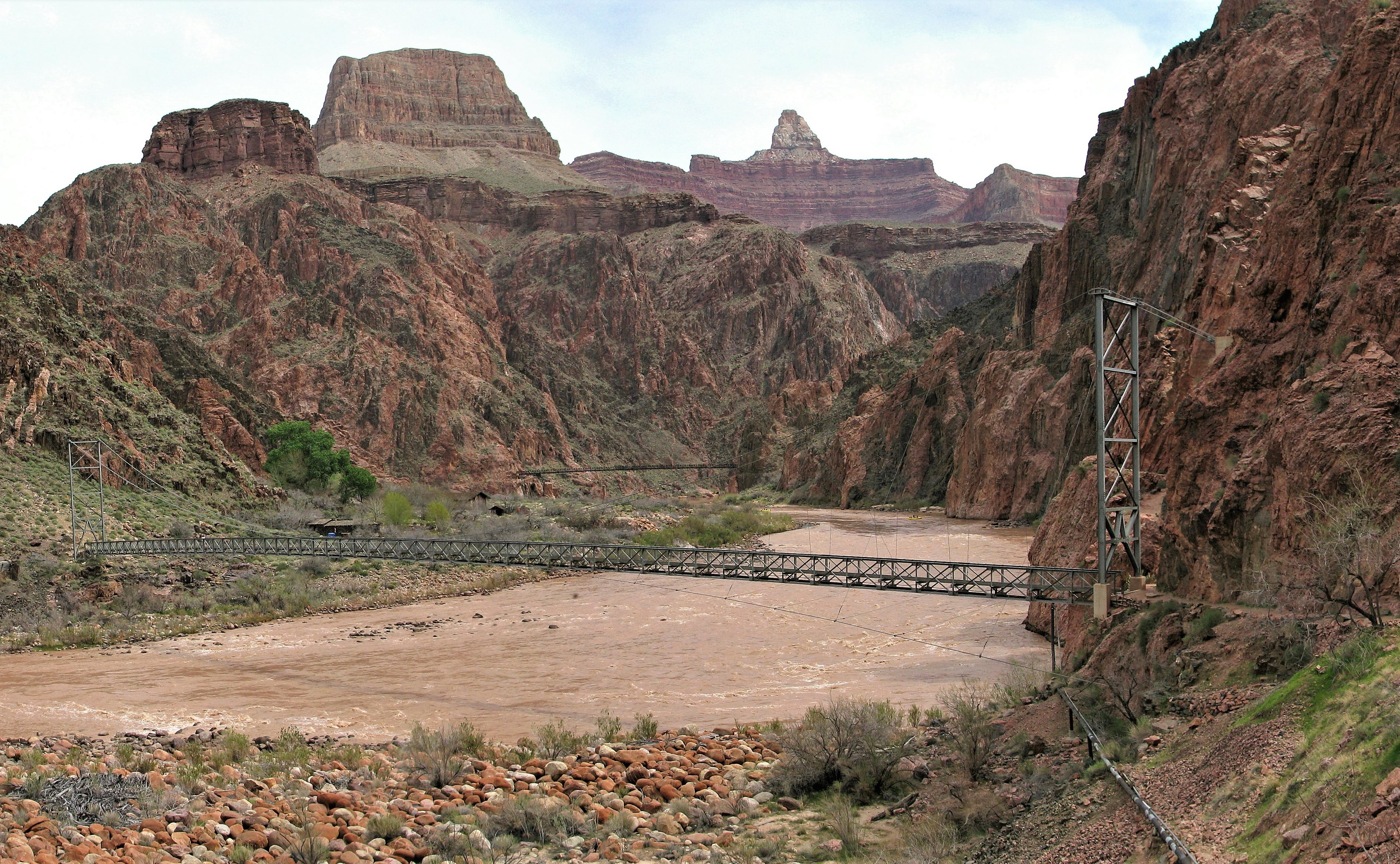
Zoroaster Temple and Sumner Butte (left) seen with footbridge over Colorado River

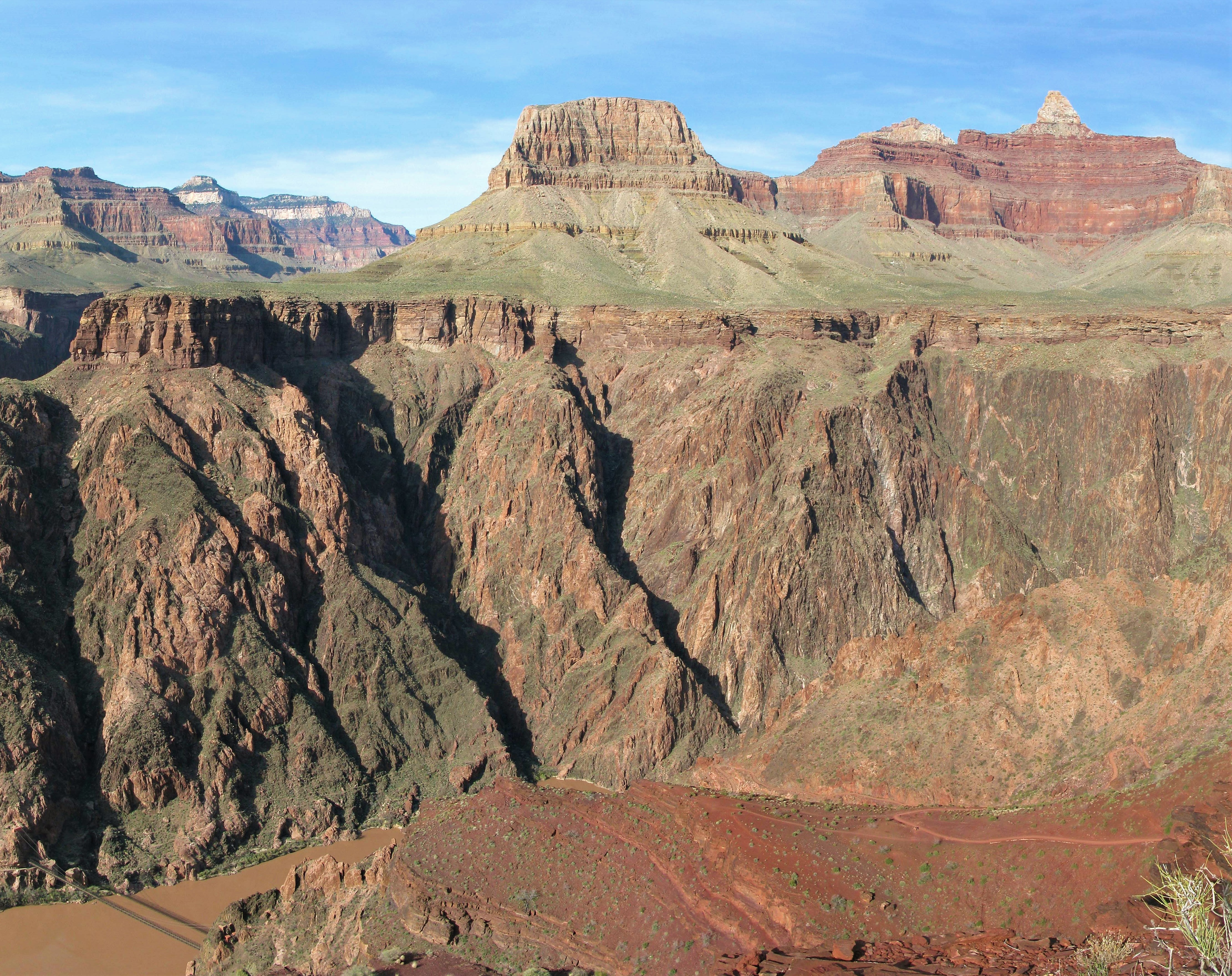
Zoroaster Temple (upper right) and Sumner Butte (center) rise above Colorado River and Vishnu Basement Rocks

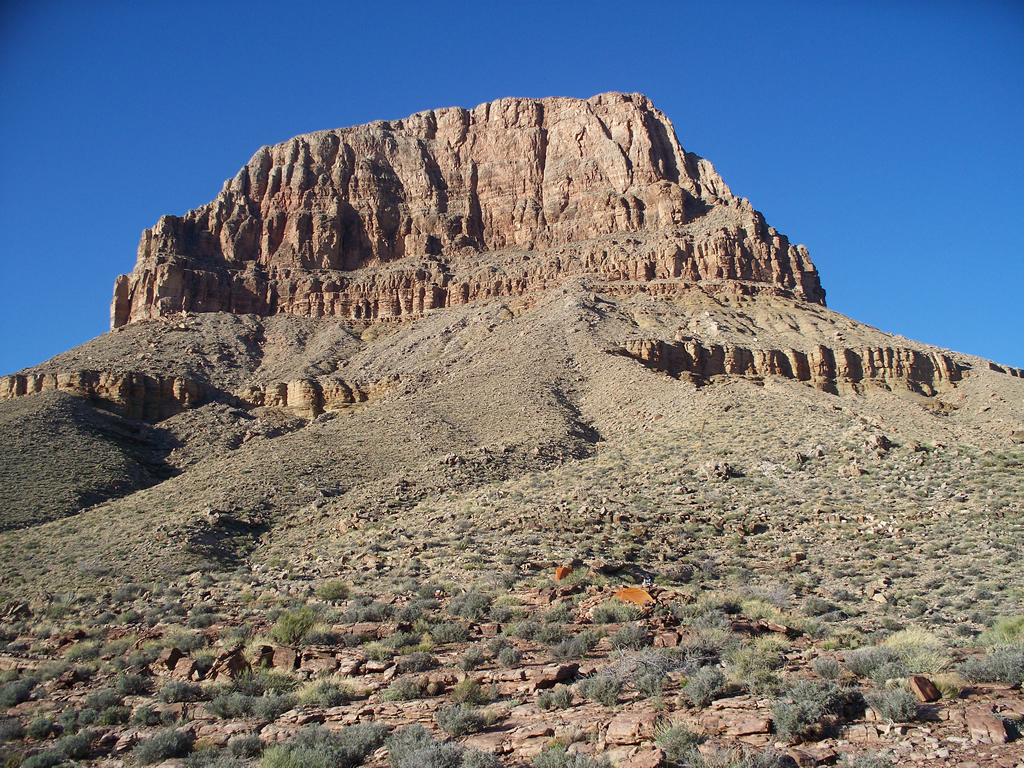
Sumner Butte's south face

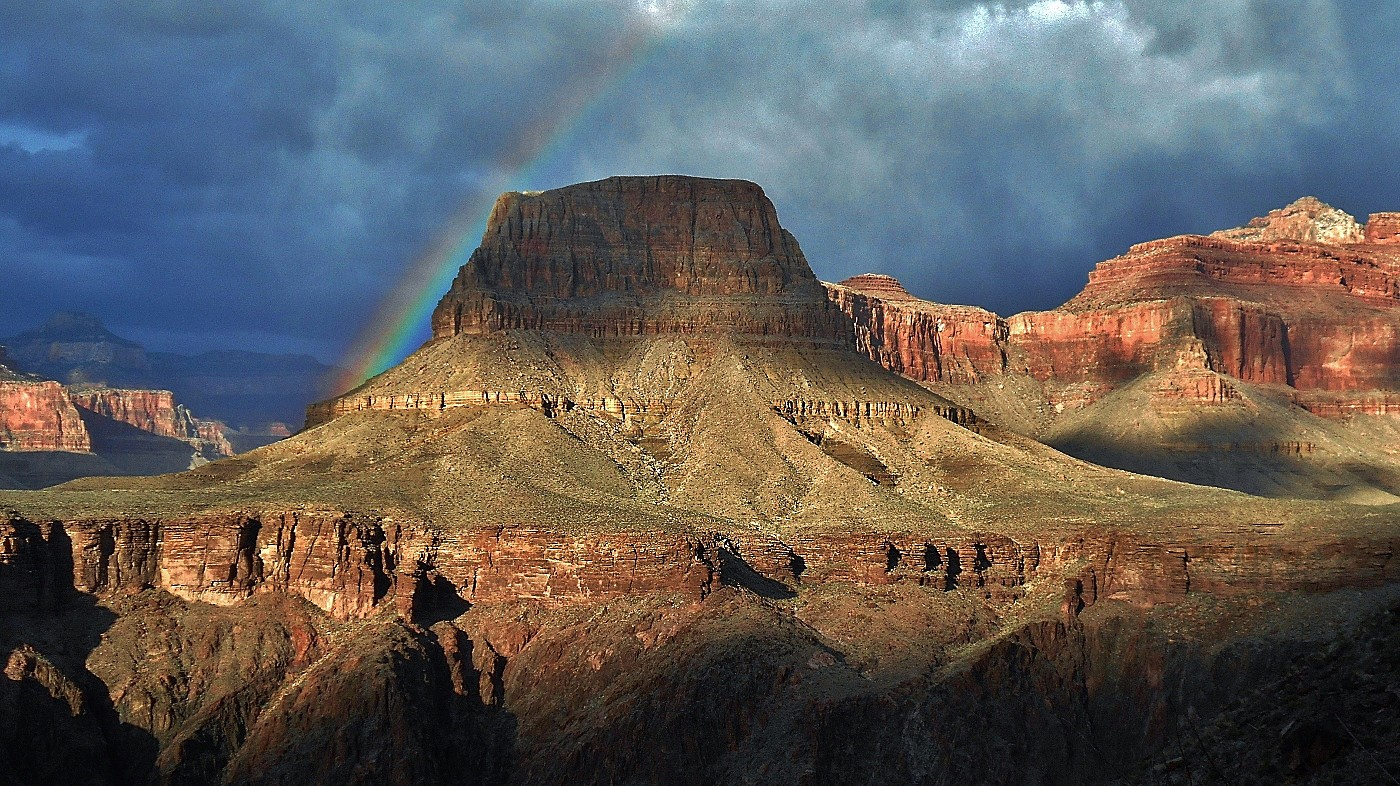
Sumner Butte

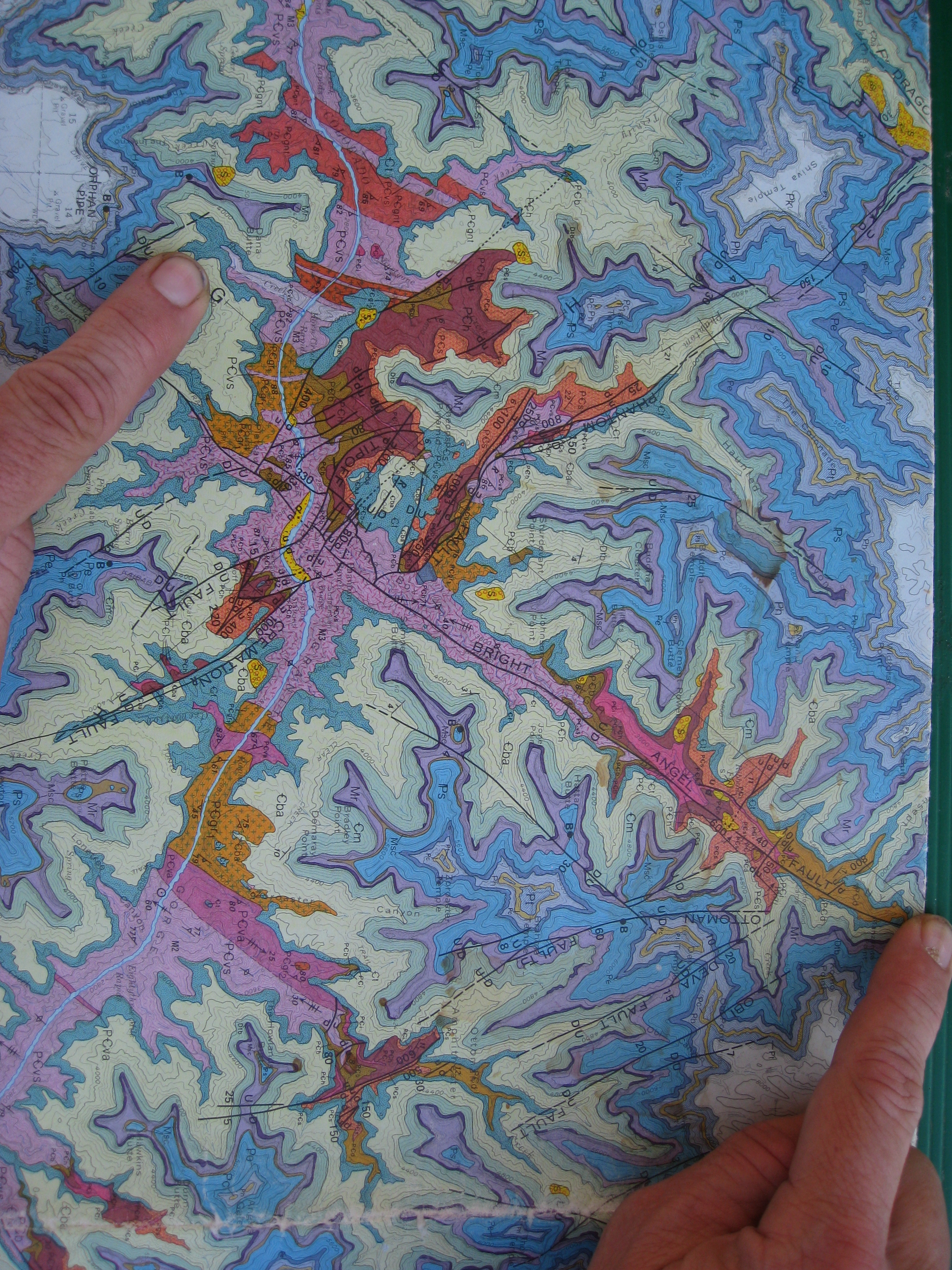
Geologic map showing caprocks of Zoroaster, Brahma, and Deva Temples-Kaibab Limestone upon a thin layer of erodible Toroweap Formation

== See also ==
- Geology of the Grand Canyon area
