= Lithographus =

Lithographus Temporal range: Permian–Cretaceous

Trace fossil classification
- Kingdom: Animalia
- Phylum: Arthropoda
- Class: Insecta
- Subclass: Pterygota
- Ichnogenus: Lithographus; Hitchcock 1858

Ichnospecies
- L. hieroglypichus Hitchcock 1858

Ichnogenus of trace fossil

Lithographus (‘rock writing’) is a Carboniferous to Cretaceous trace fossil that has been found in North America, South America, Europe, and east Asia.

The ichnogenus is characterized by alternating groups of three tracks arranged in an arrow shape. These are interpreted as tracks of cockroaches, beetles, or similar insects. The tracks are likely produced on relatively dry surfaces where the insect's legs do not drag; on wetter sediments, a more continuous trackway is created that is sometimes assigned to Grammepus.
