= Coconino Sandstone =

Geologic formation of Permian age in the southwestern United States

- Stratigraphic range: Kungurian
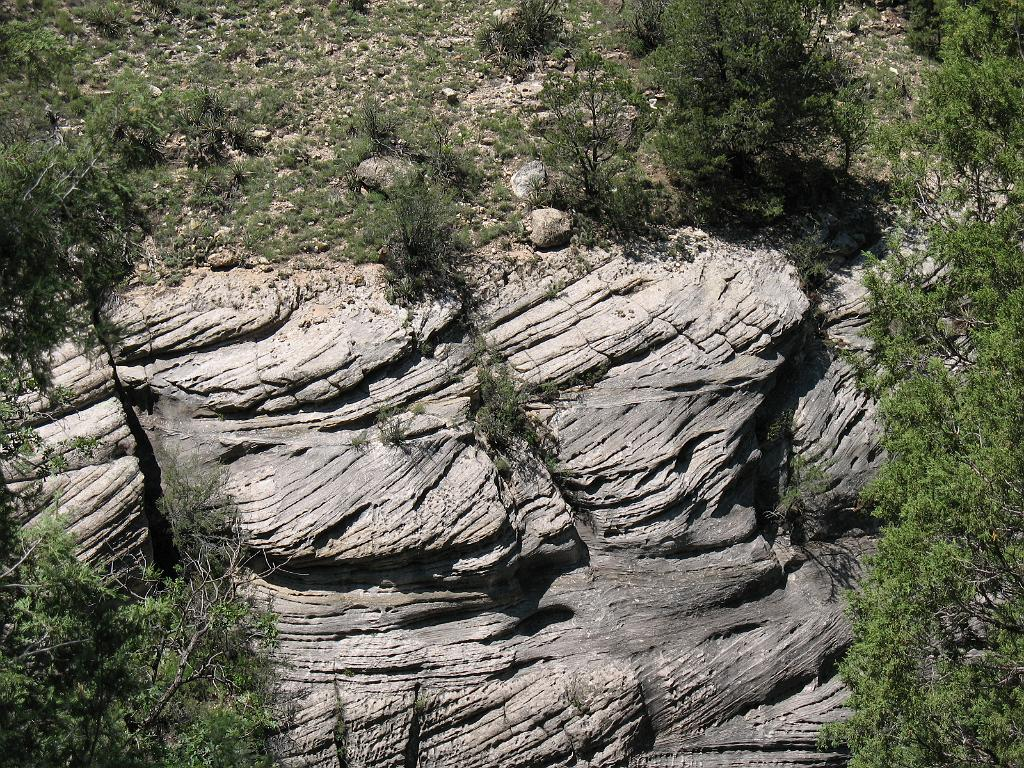
- Cliff of cross-bedded Coconino Sandstone at the Walnut Canyon National Monument, Arizona
- Type: Geological formation
- Sub-units: Harding Point Member and Cave Spring Member
- Underlies: Toroweap Formation and Kaibab Limestone. Its upper part also interfingers and merges laterally with the Toroweap Formation.
- Overlies: Hermit and Schnebly Hill formations. It also interfingers laterally with the Schnebly Hill Formation.
- Area: Colorado and Coconino plateaus
- Thickness: 65 feet (20 m) to 300 feet (91 m) in Grand Canyon region

Lithology
- Primary: Cross-bedded sandstone

Location
- Region: Arizona (northern) and Utah (southern)
- Country: United States (Southwestern United States)

Type section
- Named for: Coconino Plateau, northern Arizona
- Named by: Darton (1910)

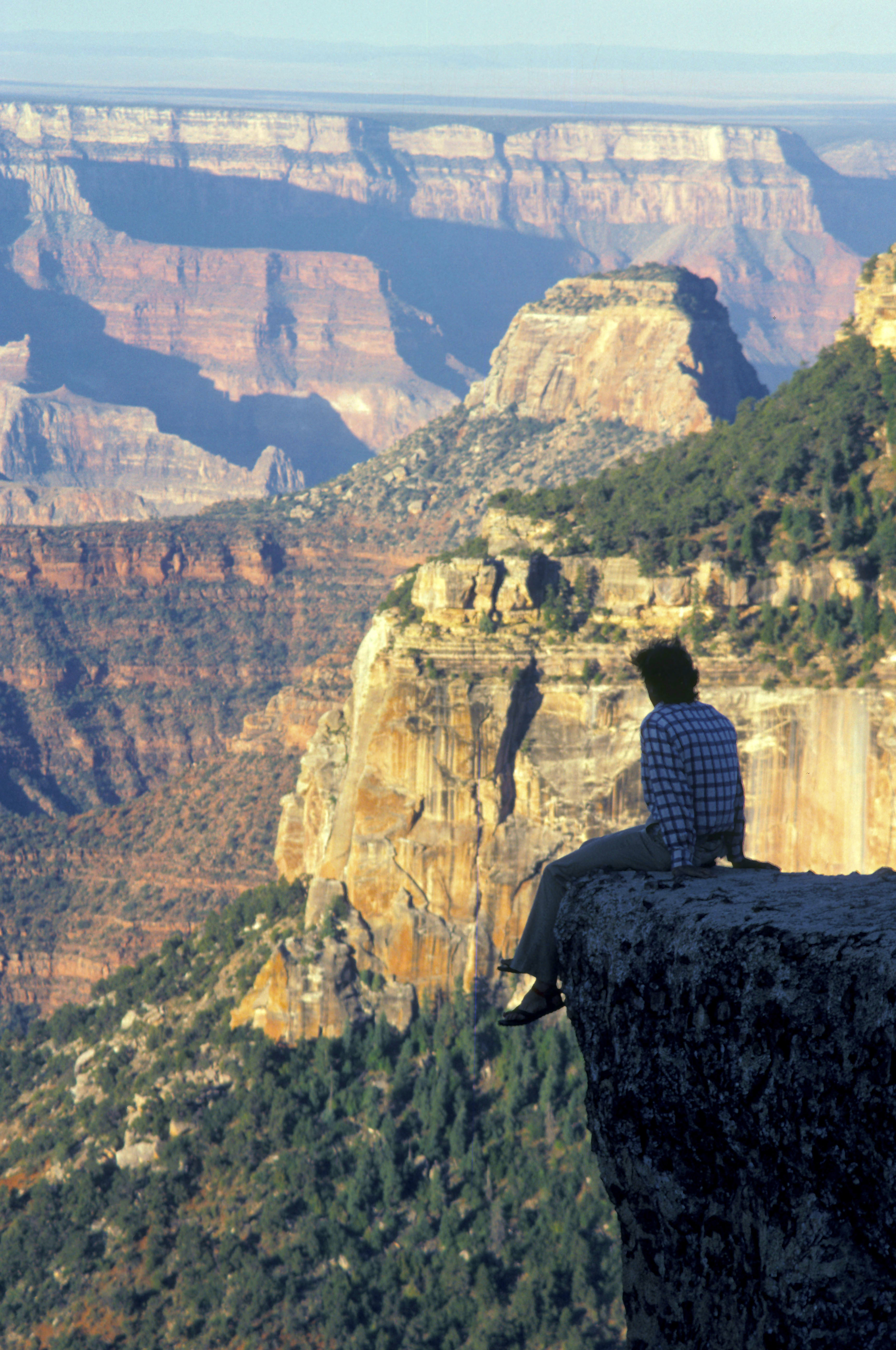
The Coconino Sandstone forms the two prominent white cliffs in the middle distance in this view from the south rim of the Grand Canyon.

The Coconino Sandstone is a Permian age geologic formation composed of light-colored quartz arenite of eolian origin. It erodes to form conspicuous, sheer cliffs in the upper walls of Grand Canyon, as part of the Mogollon Rim to the south and east, and in many other parts of the Colorado Plateau region. The Coconino Sandstone is well known for its fossil trackways of terrestrial invertebrates and vertebrates and large-scale cross-stratification.

Eastward of a north–south line from Monument Creek to Fossil Creek, the Coconino Sandstone overlies and interfingers with and grades into the Schnebly Hill Formation, which is equivalent in part to the De Chelly Sandstone in Utah. In this area, it underlies the Kaibab Limestone. Further eastward, the Coconino Sandstone likely correlates with and is contemporaneous with the Glorieta Sandstone of New Mexico. Westward of this line, the upper part of Coconino Sandstone is known as the White Rim Sandstone in Utah and the Cave Springs Member in Arizona. It interfingers and merges westward into the Toroweap Formation. The remaining lower part of the Coconino Formation is known as the Harding Point Member and underlies the Toroweap Formation and uncomfortably overlies the Hermit Formation. Between the Toroweap and Hermit formations, the Harding Point Member thins westward until it disappears.

== Nomenclature ==
In 1910, Darton named and mapped the Coconino sandstone as a member of the now abandoned Aubrey group for its widespread distribution in the Coconino Plateau. He named the Coconino sandstone for the cross-bedded gray to white sandstones that form a conspicuous sheer cliff in walls of Grand Canyon and underlies entire Coconino Plateau and the extensive Colorado Plateau north of the Grand Canyon. As defined at that time, it lay between the overlying Kaibab (Aubre) limestone and the underlying Supai formation. The Kaibab limestone was later divided onto the Kaibab Limestone and Toroweap Formation, and the Supai formation was later subdivided into the Hermit Formation and Supai Group. Later, the Coconino Sandstone was recognized and mapped in the San Rafael Swell in the Emery County, Utah, region.

In 1982, Hamilton recognized the fine-grained vitreous quartzites exposed in the Salton basin as the metamorphosed equivalent of Coconino Sandstone in the Big Maria Mountains of southeast California. Because of the change in lithology, this fine-grained quartzite was named and mapped as the Coconino Quartzite. Located in the Big Maria Mountains exposures, the Coconino Quartzite lies between the Hermit Schist and Kaibab Marble.

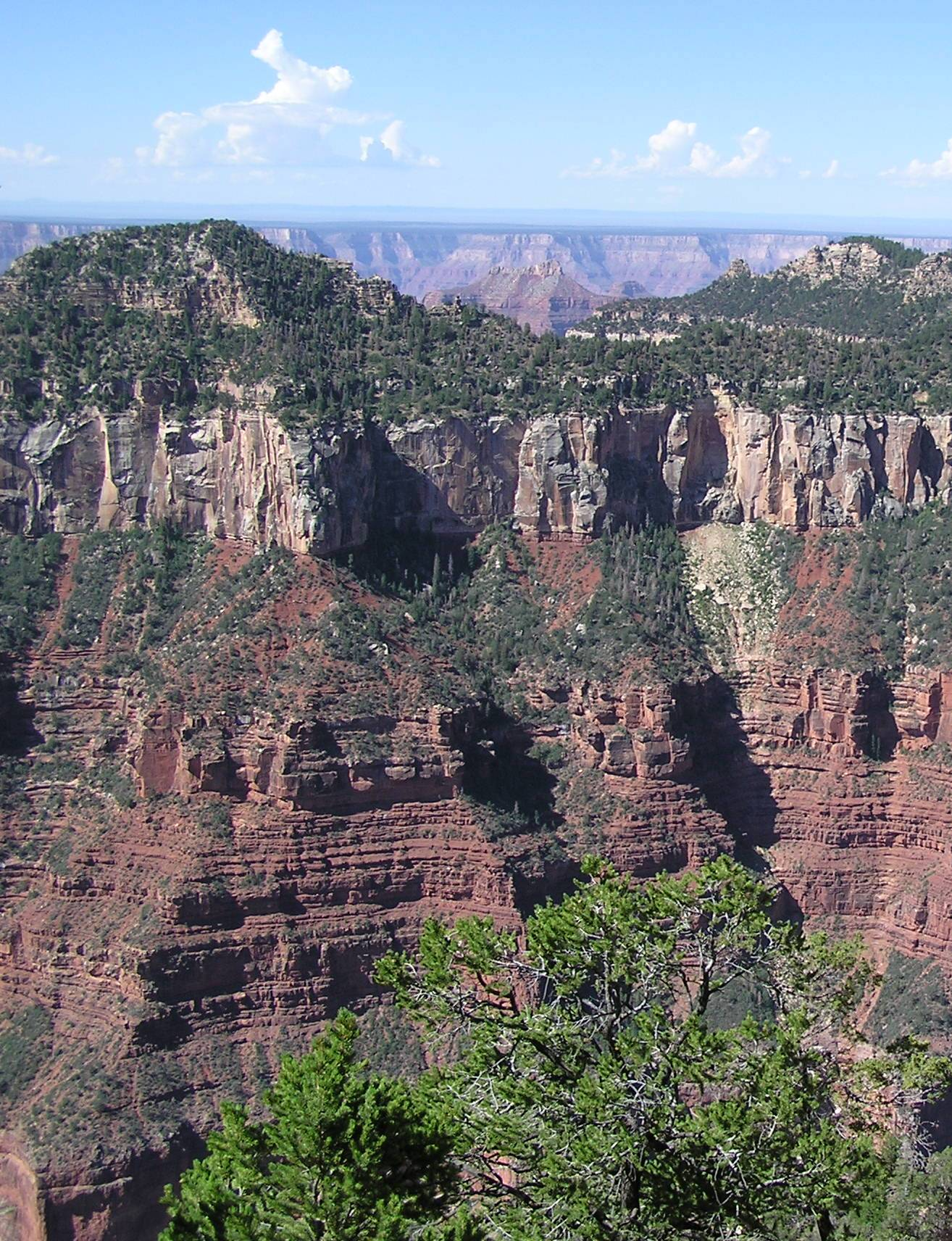
Sequence in section of North Rim showing rockfall: White Coconino on eroded slope of Hermit Shale upon resistant and sloping Supai Group – "redbeds"

== Description ==
The Coconino Sandstone consists predominately of well-sorted, uniformly fine grained 0.0045–0.98 in (0.11–24.89 mm), nearly pure quartz sand grains held together by siliceous cement. It contains a few scattered potassium feldspar grains and traces of heavy minerals. Many of the sand grains are frosted or pitted and nearly all of them are rounded to subangular. Iron oxide staining and cements are commonly absent, which is reflected in its pale, white to buff color. However, locally, the Coconino Sandstone is iron-stained and, as a result, is either a brownish color, as in Marble Canyon, or bright red, as near Flagstaff, Arizona.

The Coconino Sandstone exhibits a number of primary sedimentary structures. The most conspicuous of these is ubiquitous large-scale, wedge-planar, cross-stratification. It consists of long sweeping layers that often are 30–40 ft (9.1–12.2 m) long and as much as long as 80 ft (24 m). The cross-stratification dip mostly at 25°- 30° with few at a maximum of about 34°. Their dip is generally unimodal southward, but with a spread of readings ranging between southwest and southeast. Truncated by overlying beds, they form large, irregular wedges. In addition to the wedge-planar, cross-stratification, the Coconino Sandstone exhibits rare, large-scale, low-angle, less than 15°, cross-stratification that dip in the opposite direction. They are only found in limited numbers in a few localities within exposures of this sandstone. The basal 3–6 ft (0.91–1.83 m) of the Coconino Sandstone at many outcrops exhibits horizontal laminae. A distinctive characteristic of this sandstone is that the cross-stratification readily splits into thin plates.

Although ripple marks are not abundant within the Coconino Sandstone, they are distinctive and locally numerous. They consist typically of low, wide, and asymmetrical ripples with ripple indexes, the ratio of wavelength to amplitude, greater than 17 with most considerably higher. Typically, the ripple crests and troughs lie parallel to the direction of dip of the foreset slopes. The ripple crests are rounded and generally consist of coarser sand grains on or about their crests. The crests and troughs of these ripple are straight and parallel and, where exposed, exhibit little change in direction for distances of 3 ft (0.91 m) or more. They are less common in the Coconino Sandstone than in modern sand dunes because of the general lack of preservation of both the windward-side deposits of sand dunes and of ripple marks formed in dry sand without special circumstances.

On the bedding planes of Coconino Sandstone, the small, crater-like pits of raindrop impressions are recognized at several outcrops. They are oriented in respect to the sloping surface of laminations such that these circular pits tend to face upward, or vertically, with a raised downslope rim. Rain pits have been reproduced in the laboratory on sloping surfaces of fine dry sand to provide positive evidence of subaerial formation by brief rain showers.

Slump marks from mass movement or avalanching when lee-side slopes of dunes near the angle of repose are oversteepened are also found in the Coconino Sandstone. The slump marks range from those resulting from "successive discontinuous jerks with miniature landslides" to a series of variable and irregular lines that are roughly parallel to the lee side's slope and mark the edge of a slumped sand mass, miniature terrace-and-cliff structures, and other types of dry-sand slump marks.

The Coconino Sandstone uncommonly exhibits deformed bedding in the form of penecontemporaneously deformed cross-strata. In the few outcrops in which they are found, they can be quite abundant as near Doney Crater northeast of Flagstaff, Arizona. Typically, they consist of dipping foresets within a bed that for many feet in length have been folded locally, while the cross-strata above and below them are undisturbed.

The thickness of the Coconino Sandstone varies due to regional structural features. In the Grand Canyon area, it is only 65 feet (20 m) thick in the west, thickens to over 600 feet (180 m) in the middle and then thins to 57 feet (17 m) in the east.

== Fossils ==
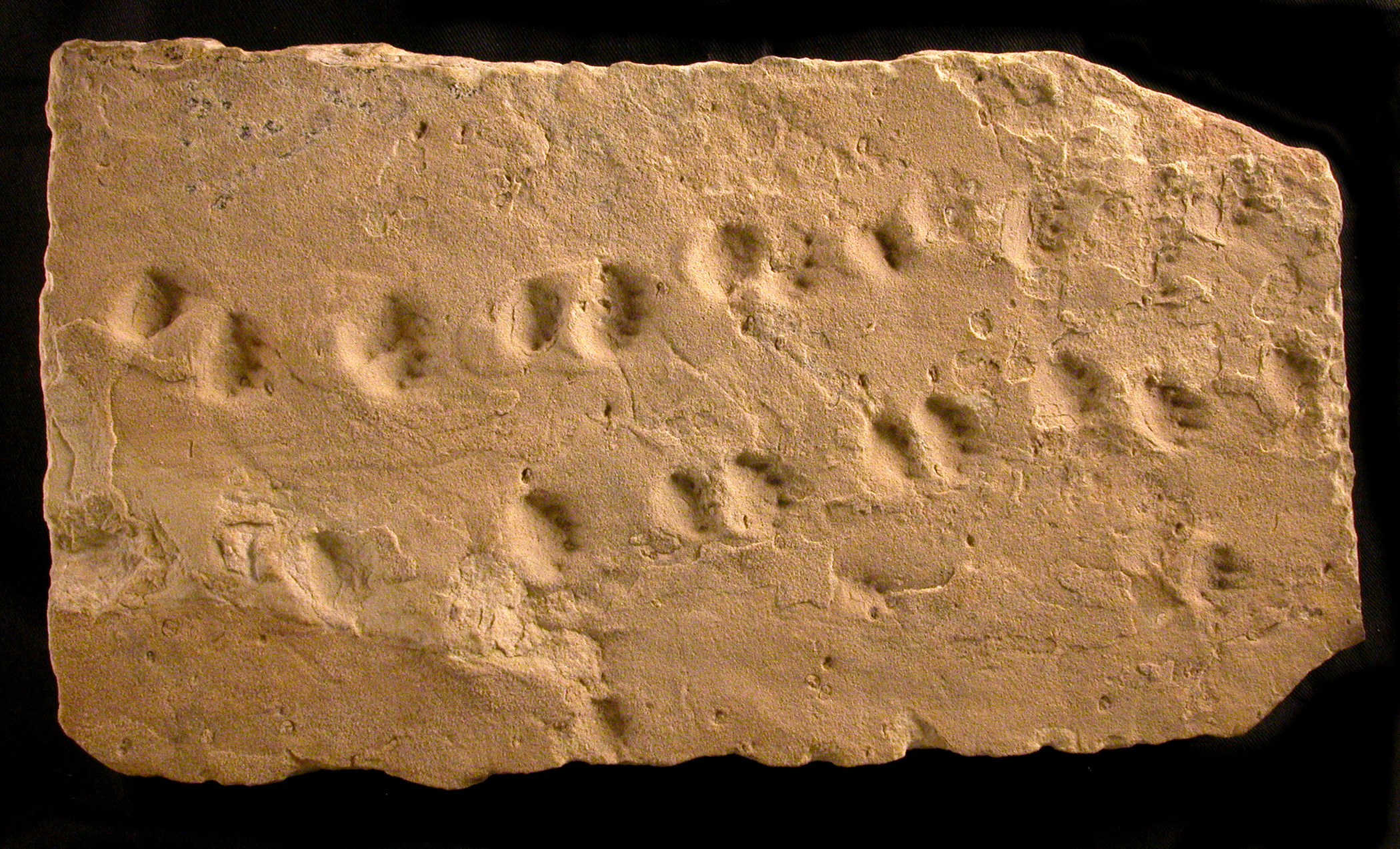
Fossil trackway in Coconino Sandstone from the Grand Canyon

The only known fossils found in the Coconino Sandstone are trace fossils. Plant fossils have yet to be reported from the Coconino Sandstone. The body fossils of invertebrates and vertebrates are also lacking. However, it is a common occurrence, especially in continental desert deposits, that trace fossils provide the only available paleontologic and palaeobotanic information for paleoenvironmental reconstructions.

The invertebrate trace fossils are known from the Coconino Sandstone include possible producers, such as worms, millipedes, isopods, spiders, scorpions. Paleohelcura, a possible scorpion track, is the most common invertebrate trace fossil. Other arthropod tracks, meniscate horizontal burrows, and conical pits have also been documented in the Coconino Sandstone. Many of the invertebrate trace specimens been collected from it include long, complete, and beautifully preserved trackways and burrows. Typically, these trace fossils are reported from the lower half of the Coconino Sandstone. They are commonly preserved on the surfaces of foreset laminae of eolian sand dunes. The invertebrate tracks were likely made on dry sand that was then moistened and covered by sand before the surface dried out, or on dunes dampened by dew. Because of the preservation of so much extramorphological variation, the effects of the trackmaker's travels across inclined sand, foreset beds can be recognized and studied. The number of valid ichnotaxa known from the Coconino Sandstone is low and consists of only six ichnogenera: Diplichnites, Diplopodichnus, Lithographus, Octopodichnus, Palaeohelcura, and Taenidium.

One fossil specimen from the Mogollon Rim area consists of two trackways, one composed of two parallel rows of tracks, Lithographus isp (possibly insect such as blattoids). The insect trackway ends abruptly after a change its path in at a tetrapod trackway trending transverse to it at a quite high pace. This association of insect and tetrapod trackways is interpreted as predation behavior by the tetrapod relative to an insect prey. This interpretation has been questioned, although predation cannot be excluded.

Because of its abundant and well-preserved vertebrate tracks and trackways, the Coconino Sandstone is one of the most famous track-bearing formation of the Grand Canyon and a standard for the description of tetrapod tracks from Paleozoic eolian strata. Fossil tracks were first reported from the Coconino Sandstone by Lull in 1918 from material collected by Schuchert in 1915 along the Hermit Trail. This was followed large-scale excavations along the Hermit Trail by John C. Merriam in 1924. In 1926 and later years, Gilmore described a number of ichnotaxa using the material excavated by Merriam. Gilmore was followed by subsequent studies of Coconino Sandstone vertebrate trace fossils, have focused on ichnotaxonomy, locomotion and paleoecology that included new material Mogollon Rim area from the middle part of the Coconino Sandstone and through comparisons with modern equivalents. The new Mogollon Rim trace fossils included specimens from the Ash Fork site. This site is well known for the presence of very long trackways, including the longest known Paleozoic trackway for number of tracks. Controversy occurred over the interpretation of some trackways as alternatively as subaerial tetrapod upslope movement on sand dunes or subaqueous current-driven lateral progression. The latter hypothesis has been since rejected by mainstream paleontologists. Since then, trace fossils from the Coconino Sandstone have been widely used to model tetrapod locomotion in eolian paleoenvironments and distinguish variability induced in track morphology by upslope versus downslope progression and differences in the transverse component of motion. Before their recognition, these variations in track morphology caused an overestimation of footprint diversity in older works and underestimation of footprint diversity in more recent works. The six vertebrate ichnotaxa, which are regarded as valid, from the Coconino Sandstone are cf. Amphisauropus isp. (anamniotes), cf. Dromopus isp. (reptile), Erpetopus isp. (reptile), Ichniotherium sphaerodactylum (synapsid), cf. Tambachichnium isp. (synapsid), and Varanopus curvidactylus (reptile). The presence of Ichniotherium and Erpetopus together in the Coconino Sandstone suggests a late Artinskian–Kungurian age for the Coconino Sandstone. Because of its stratigraphic position, Kungurian age is more likely.

== Depositional environments ==
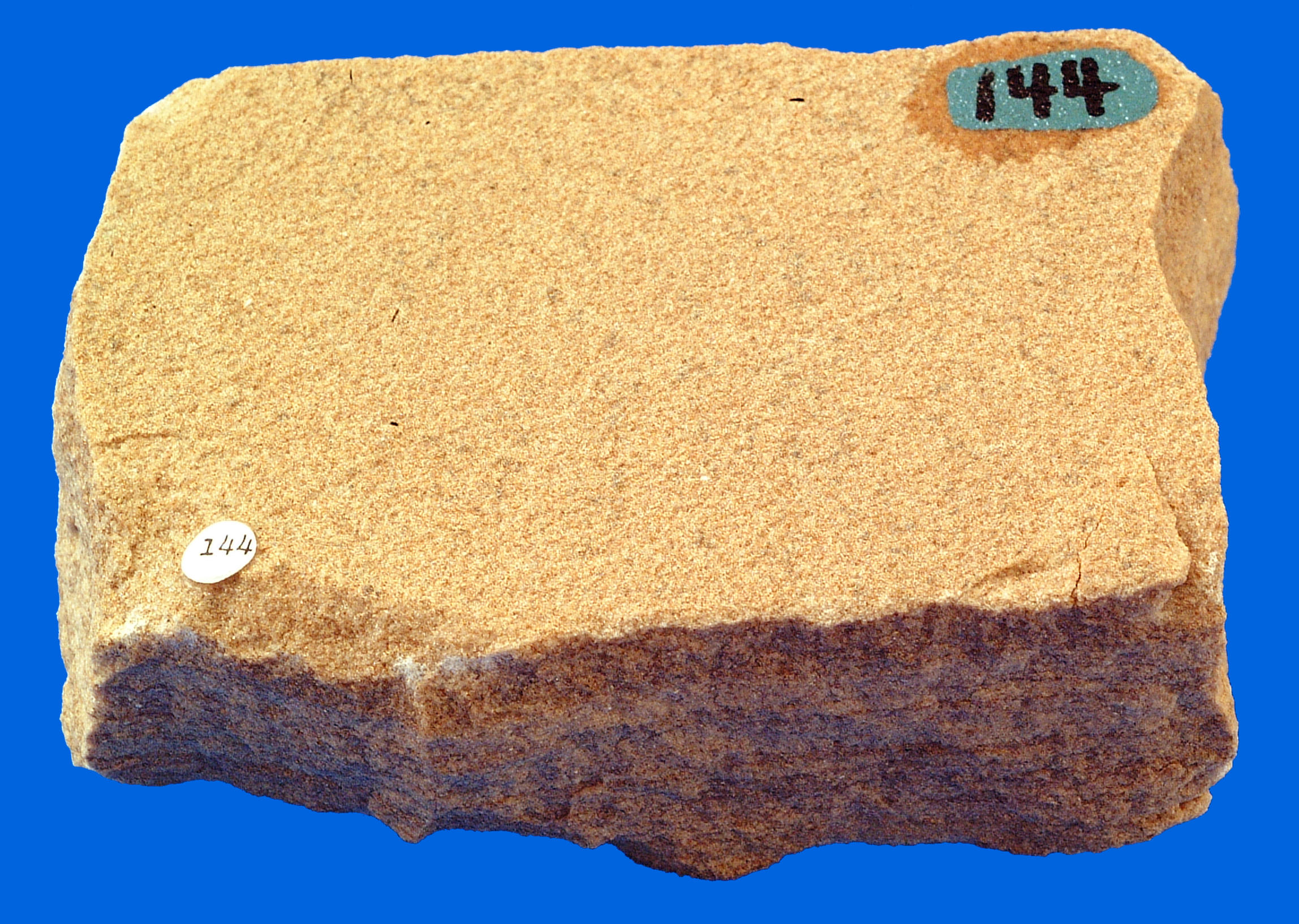
Sample of Coconino Sandstone from Arizona

It consists primarily of fine, well-sorted sand deposited by eolian processes (wind-deposited) approximately 275 million years ago. Primary sedimentary structures such as large-scale cross-stratification, ripple marks, rain impressions, slump marks, and fossil tracks are well preserved within it and contribute evidence of its eolian origin. Its composition, along with its well-sorted, uniformly fine grained sand and stratigraphic relationships, are also consistent with an eolian origin.

== Meteor crater ==
Lechatelierite (silica glass), as well as coesite and stishovite (high pressure forms of SiO_{2}), were formed during the impact of a meteorite into the Coconino Sandstone at Barringer Crater in Arizona.

== See also ==
- Geology of the Grand Canyon
- Natural history of the Grand Canyon
- Permian geologic formations
