= Kaibab Limestone =

Geologic formation in the southwestern United States

- Stratigraphic range: Early to Middle Permian, Leonardian to Roadian
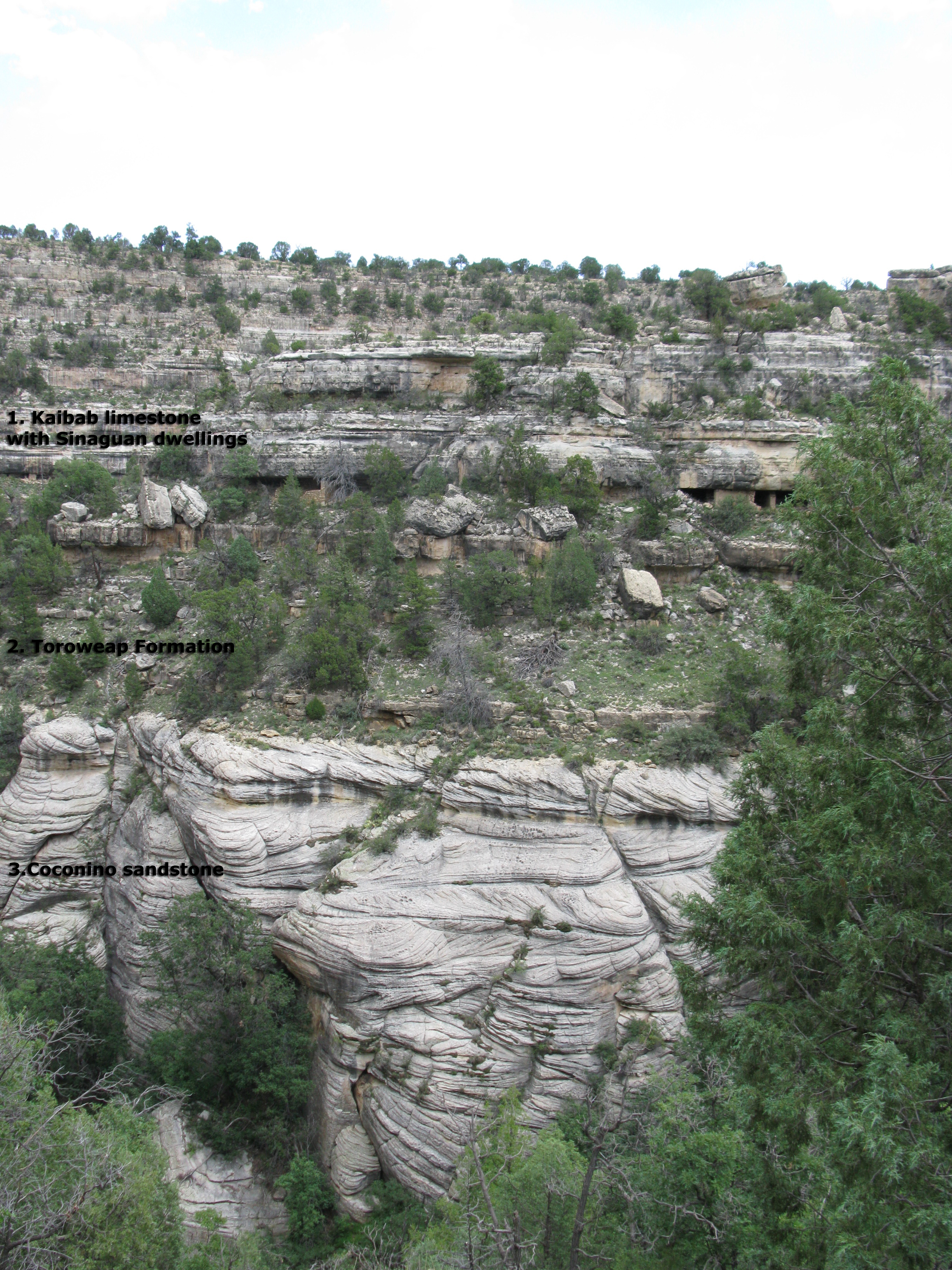
- Flat bedded Kaibab Limestone (top) overlying Toroweap Formation (vegetated slope) and cross-bedded Coconino Sandstone (cliff at bottom) at the rim of the Walnut Canyon, Flagstaff, Arizona (high resolution, expandable photo)
- Type: Geological formation
- Sub-units: Fossil Mountain and Harrisburg members
- Underlies: Moenkopi Formation
- Overlies: Toroweap Formation, Coconino Sandstone, and White Rim Sandstone
- Thickness: 300–500 feet (91–152 m) in Grand Canyon region

Lithology
- Primary: Fossiliferous limestone, sandy limestone, dolomite, and chert
- Other: Gypsum, siltstone, and sandstone

Location
- Region: Arizona (northern); California (southeast); Nevada (east-central) and, Utah (southern)
- Country: United States (Southwestern United States)

Type section
- Named for: Kaibab Plateau of northern Arizona
- Named by: Darton (1910)

Geology showing the basal layer (Kaibab Formation) of Zion National Park, southern Utah

The Kaibab Limestone is a resistant cliff-forming, Permian geologic formation that crops out across the U.S. states of northern Arizona, southern Utah, east central Nevada and southeast California. It is also known as the Kaibab Formation in Arizona, Nevada, and Utah. The Kaibab Limestone forms the rim of the Grand Canyon. In the Big Maria Mountains, California, the Kaibab Limestone is highly metamorphosed and known as the Kaibab Marble.

== Nomenclature ==
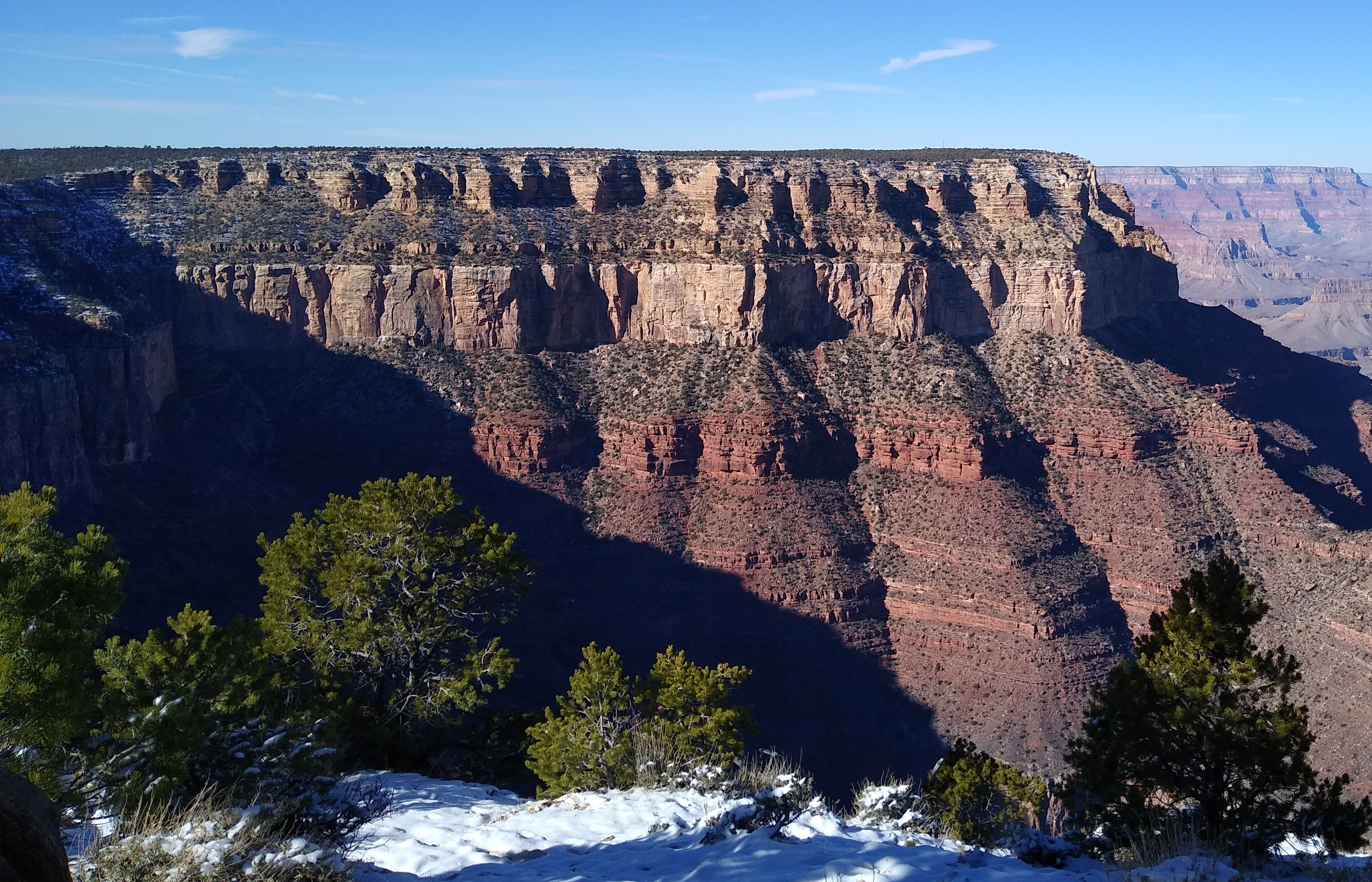
Grand Canyon. The rim top layer is the Kaibab Limestone.

The Kaibab Limestone was named by Darton in 1910 for the Kaibab Plateau, which is on the north side of Grand Canyon in Coconino County, Arizona. In his definition of the Kaibab Limestone, no type locality was designated. He also designated the Kaibab Limestone as the upper formation of the Aubrey Group, a now-abandoned stratigraphic unit. In 1921, Bassler and Reeside revised Darton's work and defined the Harrisburg gypsiferous member of the Kaibab Limestone. In his 1938 monograph on the Toroweap Formation and Kaibab Limestone of northern Arizona, McKee split Darton's original Kaibab Limestone into the currently recognized Kaibab Limestone and Toroweap Formation. He also revised Kaibab Limestone's lower contact and divided it into informal (descending) alpha, beta and gamma members. Later in the 1970s, its upper contact was revised and its areal extent was defined. Also, unsuccessful attempts were made to raise the formation to group rank and divide it into several formations. In 1991, Sorauf and Billingsley subdivided the Kaibab Limestone into (ascending) Fossil Mountain Member (new) and Harrisburg Member. They designated the strata comprising McKee's alpha (or upper) member as the Harrisburg Member and the strata comprising McKee's beta (or middle) member as the Fossil Mountain Member. The Fossil Mountain Member was named for Fossil Mountain along the south rim near the Bass Trail. McKee's gamma member was merged with the beta member to form the current Fossil Mountain Member. Later research has further redefined the regional extent of the Kaibab Limestone.

== Description ==
The Kaibab Limestone is a complex sedimentary package of interbedded and interfingering gypsum, limestone, dolomite, chert, siltstone, and sandstone that is 300–400 ft (91–122 m) thick. Erosion-resistant layers of limestone and dolomite form steep cliffs and the rims of the Grand Canyon and its tributary canyons. They also underlie most of the expansive surface of the Kaibab Plateau surrounding the Grand Canyon. Less erosion-resistant sandstones, siltstones, and cherts form distinct recesses along cliff faces. It is correlated to the Leonard series of West Texas and the Phosphoria Formation of Idaho. The upper part of the formation extends into the Guadalupian.

As previously noted, the Kaibab Limestone is currently subdivided into two members, the Fossil Mountain Member and the underlying Harrisburg Member, in the Grand Canyon area. Eastward, both members become more sandy, silty, and clayey at the expense of limestone, dolomite, and chert, until both members consist uniformly of interbedded and interfingering sandstone, sandy limestone, and sandy dolomite that that cannot be subdivided into individual members.

The Fossil Mountain Member consists largely of light gray, cherty, thick-bedded limestone. It is named for its type locality at Fossil Mountain, which lies just east of the Bass Trail in Grand Canyon National Park, Arizona. The Fossil Mountain Member forms a continuous and prominent cliff overlying the slope-forming Woods Ranch Member of the Toroweap Formation. The distribution of chert is argued to reflect the original occurrence and abundance of siliceous sponges and accumulation of their spicules. In the western part of the Grand Canyon region, it consists predominately of fossiliferous limestone. Eastward, it grades eastward into nondescript sandstone, sandy carbonate, and dolomite and thins from approximately 250–300 ft (76–91 m) thick to about 200 ft (61 m) thick at Fossil Mountain along the south rim.

The Harrisburg Member, formerly known as either the alpha or Harrisburg gypsiferous member, consists of interbedded light-red to pale-gray limestone and dolomite, siltstone, sandstone, and gypsum. These strata form a sloping surface with projecting ledges of limestone and dolomite. It is named for exposures at Harrisburg Dome, its type locality in southwestern Utah. The Harrisburg Member is about 160–300 ft (49–91 m) thick. East of a line running roughly north-south from near Page to east and south of Flagstaff, the Harrisburg Member grades into calcareous sandstone and becomes in separatable from overlying Fossil Mountain Member. East of that line, the Kaibab Limestone is known as the Kaibab Formation.

The Big Maria and Little Maria mountains in Riverside County, California expose strongly deformed and overturned metasedimentary strata. These cratonic metasedimentary rocks stratigraphically correlate with Paleozoic and Mesozoic strata exposed in the Grand Canyon region. They have been highly metamorphosed to upper middle to upper greenschist grade. These metasedimentary strata are preserved as roof pendants surrounded by Late Cretaceous dioritic and granitic plutons. The uppermost Paleozoic metasedimentary strata in the Big Maria region have been designated and mapped as the Kaibab Marble. It consists of calcitic and subordinate dolomitic marbles, metachert, quartzite, and minor anhydrite schist. The Kaibab Marble shows a variety of colors including white, gray, buff, yellow, pink, and brown. Commonly, these colors are striped by dark-weathering metachert. Exposures of the Kaibab Marble typically exhibits spectacular isoclinal folds, recumbent folds, and disrupted structures on all scales. Because of tectonic deformation, it ranges in thickness from 2–300 ft (0.61–91.44 m). It likely consists of metamorphised, undifferentiated limestones and dolomites of both the Toroweap Formation and Kaibab Limestone.

== Contacts ==
Within the Grand Canyon region, the Kaibab Limestone overlies gypsum and contorted sandstones of the Toroweap Formation. Originally, geologists interpreted the lower contact of the Kaibab Limestone to be an unconformity based on the presence of local intraformational breccias and erosional surfaces. However, additional research has concluded that these local intraformational breccias and erosional surfaces are the result of collapse following the dissolution of evaporite deposits within the upper part of the Toroweap Formation. As a result, this contact is inferred to be conformable or only locally a disconformity. South and east of the Grand Canyon, the evaporites and contorted sandstones (sabkha deposits) of Toroweap Formation interfinger with and are replaced by cross-bedded sandstones of the Coconino Sandstone. As a result, the Kaibab Limestone directly overlies the Coconino Sandstone in the Mogollon Rim region. The Kaibab Limestone directly overlies the White Rim Sandstone in northeastern Arizona and southeastern Utah.

The upper contact of the Kaibab Limestone (Harrisburg Member) with the overlying Moenkopi Formation is an erosional unconformity and disconformity. Within northwestern Arizona, southeastern Nevada, and southwestern Utah this contact is an erosional unconformity that in part consists of paleovalleys, as much as several hundred feet deep, and paleokarst that were eroded into the underlying Kaibab Limestone before the deposition of the Moenkopi Formation. These paleovalleys are often filled with conglomerates and breccias that are known as the Rock Canyon conglomerate. Within the Marble Canyon and eastern Grand Canyon regions and south into Verde Valley, upper contact of the Kaibab Limestone with the Moenkopi Formation is an erosional disconformity. This disconformity exhibits little relief and is identified by marked differences in color, topography, and rock types between tan, ledge-forming, calcareous sandstones and of the Kaibab Limestone and red, slope-forming siltstones of the Moenkopi formation. The unconformity and disconformity are inferred to represent most of Permian time (including the Leonardian) and part of Early Triassic time.

Although the Moenkopi Formation overlies the Kaibab Limestone, its redbeds have been removed almost entirely by erosion because they are less resistant to erosion than the strata of the Kaibab Formation. As a result, the Kaibab Limestone forms the surface of many of the vast plateaus that border the Grand Canyon. Within these plateaus, the uppermost beds of the Kaibab Limestone have also been largely removed by erosion.

== Fossils ==
The Kaibab Limestone contains the abundant fossils of Permian invertebrates and vertebrates. The invertebrate fossils found within the Kaibab Limestone include brachiopods, conodonts, corals, crinoids, echinoid spines, mollusks, hexactinellid and other sponges, trilobites, and burrows of callanassid shrimp. The fossil cephalopods found in the Kaibab Limestone include giant football-sized nautiloids. Fossil shark teeth, which represent a diverse assemblage of chondrichthyans, occur within the Kaibab Limestone of Arizona.

== Depositional environments ==
The complex intercalation of carbonate and clastic sediments within the Kaibab Limestone reflects the deposition of sediments within a gently sloping continental margin during a period of frequent, high-frequency sea level changes. Relatively minor changes in sea level caused major lateral shifts in the position of supratidal, subtidal, and shallow-marine environments during the deposition of the Kaibab Limestone. The shifting sea levels and associated depositional environments brought about a complex interlayering of different types of carbonate and clastic sediments in the strata that comprise the Kaibab Limestone. The gently sloping continental margin on which the Kaibab Limestone accumulated, extended seaward from northern Arizona to southern Nevada, at times exceeding 200 miles (125 km) in width. It is most likely that the high-frequency changes in sea level were caused by glacial sea level oscillations during this period.

== Age ==
Early paleontological studies of the Kaibab Limestone firmly established its age on the basis of the abundant fossils that it and the underlying Toroweap Formation contain. On the basis of its brachiopod and siliceous sponge faunas, it was initially concluded that it is Leonardian (approximately Kungurian / latest Early Permian) in age. Later research concerning conodonts and associated megafossils obtained from western outcrops of the Fossil Mountain Member indicates that its age extends into the Roadian (latest Early Permian and earliest Middle Permian) age.

== Geographic distribution ==
Geologic province:

- Basin and Range province*
- Black Mesa Basin*
- Great Basin province*
- Paradox Basin*
- Plateau Sedimentary Province*
- Salton Basin*

Parklands (incomplete list):

- Capitol Reef National Park – see Geology of the Capitol Reef area
- Grand Canyon – see Geology of the Grand Canyon area
- Zion National Park – see Geology of the Zion and Kolob canyons area
- Grand Staircase–Escalante National Monument

Other:

- Blue Diamond Mine on Blue Diamond Hill in Clark County, Nevada

== See also ==
- List of types of limestone
- Geology of the Grand Canyon area

== Popular references ==
- Blakey, R., and W. Ranney, 2008, Ancient Landscapes of the Colorado Plateau. Grand Canyon Association, Grand Canyon Village, Arizona. 176 pp. ISBN 978-1934656037
- Chronic, H., 1983, Roadside Geology of Arizona. 23rd printing. Mountain Press Publishing Company, Missoula Montana. 322 pp. ISBN 978-0-87842-147-3
- Lucchitta, I., 2001, Hiking Arizona's Geology. Mountaineers's Books, Seattle, Washington. 269 pp. ISBN 0-89886-730-4
