= Toroweap Formation =

Geologic formation in the southwestern United States

- Stratigraphic range: late early Permian, 273–272 Ma
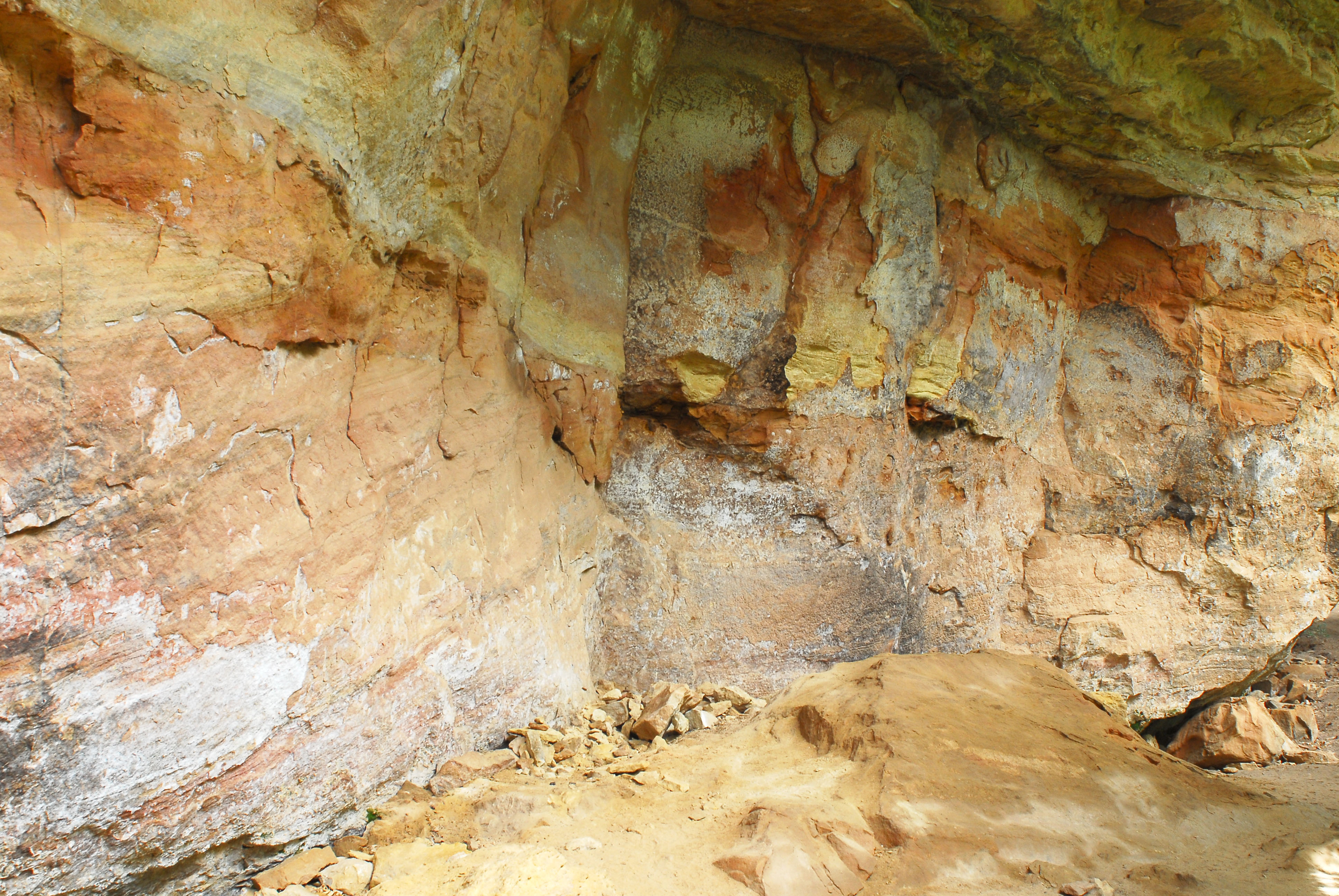
- Toroweap Formation in Grand Canyon National Park
- Type: Geological formation
- Sub-units: Seligman, Brady Canyon, and Woods Ranch members (oldest to youngest)
- Underlies: Kaibab Limestone
- Overlies: Coconino Sandstone
- Thickness: 200 feet (61 m) approximate maximum.

Lithology
- Primary: red beds, gypsum, and fossiliferous limestone
- Other: dolomite

Location
- Coordinates: 36°12′19.34″N 113°05′24.40″W
- Region: (southwest)-Colorado Plateau; Northern Arizona, southeast Utah
- Extent: Grand Canyon, North Rim, (Kaibab Plateau), also South Rim, and elsewhere in Arizona, Utah, Nevada

Type section
- Named for: Toroweap Valley, Arizona
- Named by: McKee (1938)

The Toroweap Formation outcrops as a distinct layer of generally darker, interbedded slope- and cliff-forming strata lying between the brighter colored cliffs of the Kaibab Limestone above, and Coconino Sandstone below. It outcrops in Grand Canyon, Arizona, Southwestern United States, found throughout walls of the South Rim, Grand Canyon, and the North Rim, of the Kaibab Plateau. Also, it outcrops in the Kaibab's southeast extension to Cape Royal, the Walhalla Platea. The formation is also found in southeast Utah and west-central Nevada.

== Nomenclature ==
The complex history of the stratigraphic classification of the strata comprising the Toroweap Formation began in 1875 when geological expeditions studied the geology of the Colorado Plateau and first recognized the occurrence of uppermost Paleozoic strata of this region. In this year, Gilbert named and mapped them as the Aubrey limestone, the Aubrey sandstones, and the Redwall limestone. The first step in this process came when Darton in 1910, officially changed the name of the Aubrey limestone to the Kaibab limestone without naming a type locality. He selected Kaibab from the Kaibab Plateau, on the north side of the canyon, whose surface is capped by the Kaibab Limestone. In 1914, Noble recognized that the Kaibab limestone, as defined by Darton in 1910, largely consisted not of limestone, but instead mainly of sandstones, red beds, evaporites, and other sedimentary rocks. Later, Noble in 1914 and Burnsife and Bassler in 1922, subdivided Darton's Kaibab limestone into five subdivisions on the basis of their distinct and differing lithologies. In 1938, McKee McKee split Darton's original Kaibab Limestone the currently recognized Kaibab Limestone and Toroweap Formation and formally named the latter with a type locality. He, also, subdivided each formation from top to bottom into informal alpha, beta, and gamma members. In 1991, Sorauf and others formally named each informal member with type localities. From top to bottom, the alpha member became the Woods Ranch Member; the beta member became the Bardy Canyon Member; and the gamma member became the Seligman Member.

== Description ==
The Toroweap Formation exhibits well-defined lateral and vertical changes in facies over its outcrop. In the western extent of its outcrop in the Grand Canyon region and adjacent parts of Utah and Nevada, the Toroweap Formation is readily subdivided, in ascending order, into the Seligman, Brady Canyon, and Woods Ranch members. Two of these members (Seligman and Woods Ranch members ) consist of red beds and evaporites (gypsum) and are separated by a fossiliferous limestone member (Brady Canyon Member). The red beds of the Seligman and Woods Ranch members are largely of soft, friable sediments, which rapidly weather into slopes, The Brady Canyon Member is a resistant limestone which characteristically stands up as a prominent cliff between the slopes of the Seligman and Woods Ranch members. Further eastward, the Brady Canyon Member disappears, and the two red bed members merged into an undivided Toroweap Formation. Further east, the red beds grade laterally into cross-bedded sandstones of the Sand Cave Member of the Coconino Sandstone.

The Seligman Member of the Toroweap formation largely consists of fine-grained, red and yellow sandstone. It typically exhibits flat or irregular bedding. Its maximum observed thickness is about 50 ft (15 m) and in most places is no thicker than 45 ft (14 m). At its upper contact, the Seligman Member grades upwards through a transitional zone of alternating beds of sandstone and limestone into the fossiliferous limestone of the Brady Canyon Member. In Grand Wash Canyon on Lake Mead, the sandstones of the Seligman Member contain a very conspicuous layer of breccia, interpreted to be an intraformational conglomerate, only a few feet above the top of the Coconino Sandstone. The basal layer of the Seligman Member is a red sandstone or siltstone composed of Coconino-like quartz grains scattered through finer-grained sediment. The Seligman Member interfingers with and lies conformably on the underlying Coconino Sandstone.

Overlying the Seligman Member is the Brady Canyon Member. It consists of cliff-forming limestone and dolomite. Laterally, the Brady Canyon Member is divisible into two facies grading from one through a third transitional facies into the other using differences in lithology and fossil content. The first facies is exposed in an area from the extreme western edge of its outcrop belt east to Toroweap Valley and southeast almost to Seligman, Arizona. This facies consists of a marine limestone that is mostly coarsely crystalline and cherty in some beds. This facies contains a fauna dominated by brachiopods and echinoids. The second facies of the Brady Canyon Member is exposed in outcrops eastward past Seligman, Arizona to where it merges and terminates within the enclosing red beds. In consist of fine-grained, mostly sand-, silt-, and clay-free limestone. It contains a fauna composed almost exclusively of abundant, but poorly preserved, pelecypods and gastropods. It apparently accumulated nearer the coastline and likely under brackish-water conditions. The transition zone between the two facies consists of an unfossiliferous, thin-bedded (1 to 2 in (2.5 to 5.1 cm) thick), uniform-textured dolomite. This limestone weathers into smooth, small, angular cobbles. In western Grand Canyon region, it is thickest, as much as to 280 ft (85 m) thick. The Brady Canyon Member thins uniformly to the east where it is of approximately 220 ft (67 m) thick in the type section in Toroweap Valley and disappears near Marble Canyon as it merges with the overlying Woods Ranch Member. Beds of the third (dolomite) facies recur between overlying red beds of the Woods Ranch Member and the other facies of the Brady Canyon Member as part of a gradational contact between these members. Below Desert View Point in Grand Canyon, the Brady Canyon Member is about 20 ft (6.1 m) thick and is entirely missing in outcrops along the Little Colorado Canyon and in Sycamore Canyon.

The red beds of the Woods Ranch Member consist of interbedded layers of gypsum, thin-bedded dolomite, and sandstone. Eastward of Havasu Canyon this member lack gypsum and dolomite and contains beds of white, cross-bedded sandstone. Breccias or intraformational conglomerates occur in many places throughout the entire outcrop of the Woods Ranch Member. Associated with these breccias in some places are lacustrine travertines. A prominent feature found throughout the entire outcrop of the Woods Ranch Member is a fossil-bearing limestone, It occurs over a remarkably wide area without appreciable variation with a thickness of only 3 to 4 ft (0.91 to 1.22 m). The fossils found everywhere in with this marker bed consist only of a pelecypod of the genus Schizodus. This member forms distinctive slopes and attains a maximum thickness of about 180 ft (55 m).

== Fossils ==
the Brady Canyon Member and a marker bed in the Woods Ranch Member are the only fossiliferous strata within the Toroweap Formation. The western, open marine limestones of the Brady Canyon Member contain numerous fossils of bryozoans, brachiopods, bivalves, nautiloids, gastropods, scaphopods, ostracodes, crinoids, echinoids, and stromatolites. The eastern, fine-grained limestones also contain abundant, poorly preserved, fossils of brackish-water pelecypods and gastropods. In the Woods Ranch Member, fossils are limited to a bed of limestone containing the abundant and poorly preserved fossils of the pelecypod, Schizodus.

As of 2021, published information on the occurrence and nature of invertebrate and vertebrate trace fossils found in the Toroweap Formation is lacking even though they should be present in the sedimentary strata comprising it. It is highly likely that dedicated search for them will yield some.

== Depositional environments ==
Marine transgressions, terrestrial wind-blown sand, coastal environments laid down the Kaibab, Toroweap, and Coconino formations. At different time, the marine waters came from the west, and receded and re-transgressed. The Coconino Formation represents a regional subaerial sea of sand that existed during a major regression. The Toroweap Formation represents a major marine transgression into the Grand canyon area during which red beds of the Seligman Member accumulated in supratidal, tidal, and terrestrial coastal plain environments. The overlying limestones of the Brady Canyon Member accumulated in open and brackish-water environments during the maximum extent of the marine transgression. A brief regression buried the sediments of the Brady Canyon Member under additional supratidal, tidal, and terrestrial coastal plain red beds of the Woods Ranch Member. The two members of the overlying Kiabab Limestone represent two additional major marine transgression into the Grand Canyon region.

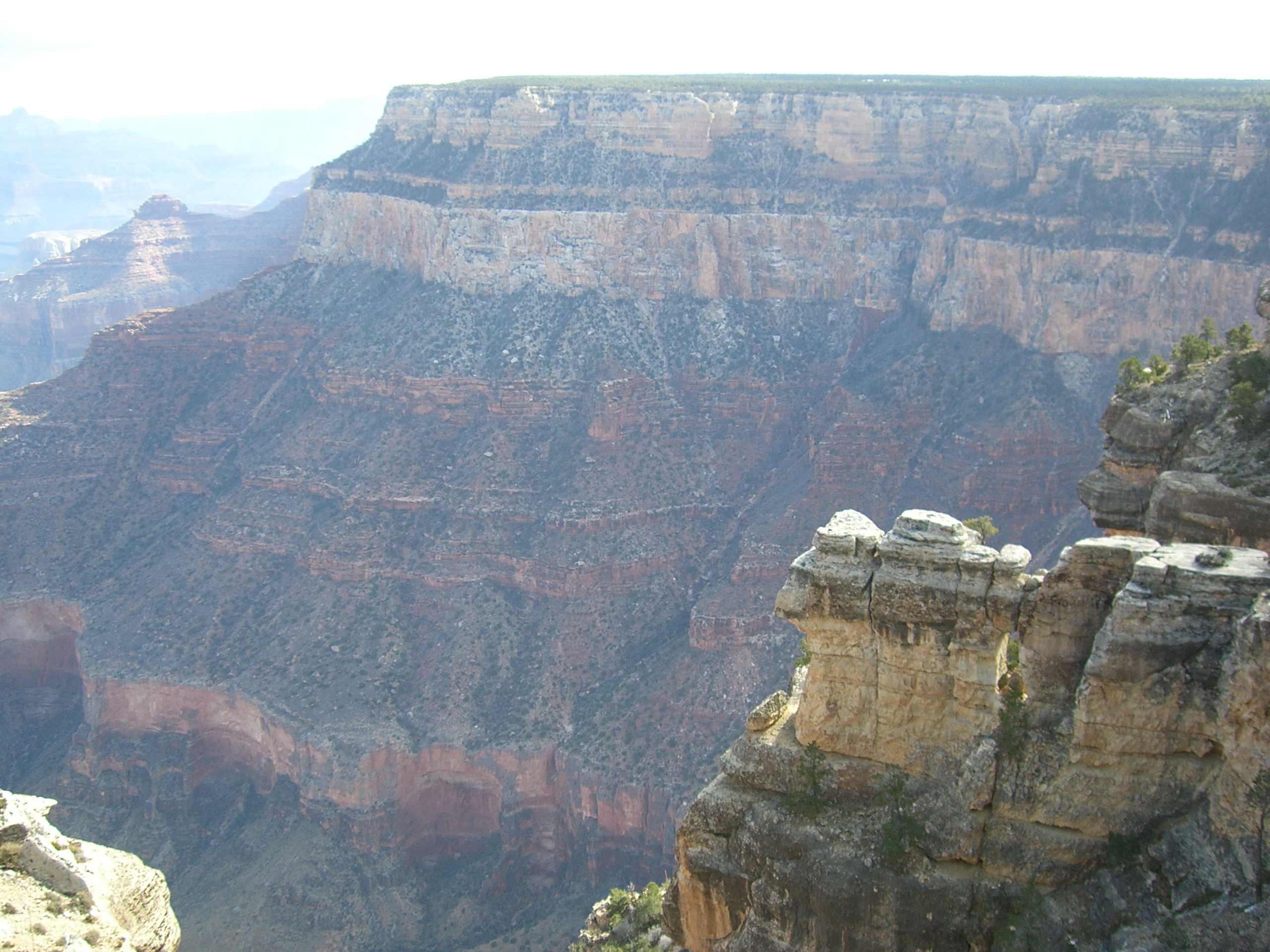
North Rim, Grand Canyon showing Permian formations: rim-forming Kaibab Limestone, slope-cliff-slope sequence of Toroweap Formation, high, white cliff of Coconino Sandstone, vegetation-covered slope of Hermit Formation, and slopes and cliffs of Supai Group "redbeds")

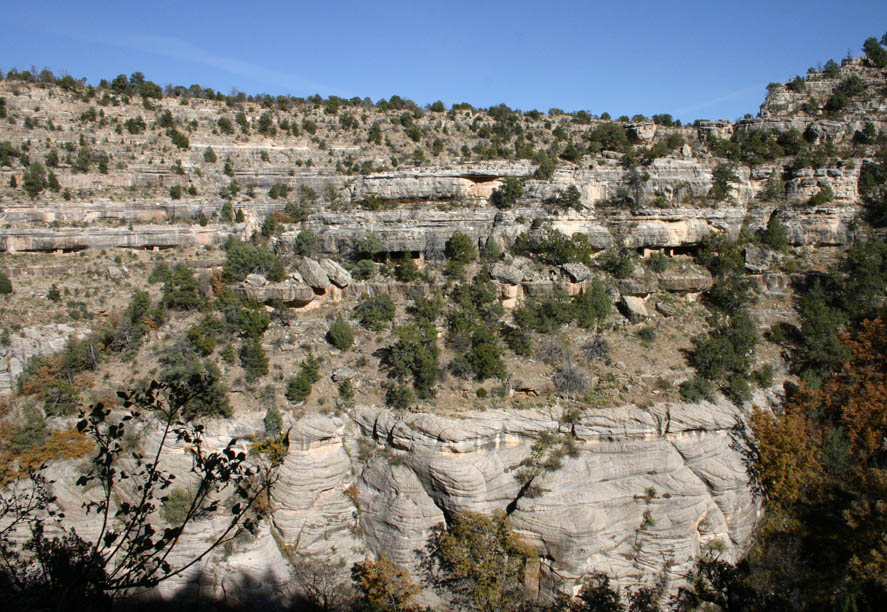
Toroweap Formation in Walnut Canyon, east of Flagstaff, Arizona. The darker middle section is the vegetation covered slope of the Toroweap Formation. Above it is Kaibab Limestone. Below it is Coconino Sandstone showing cross-bedding of fossil dunes.(note: cross-bedding of dunes compared to horizontal bedding of Kaibab Limestone)

== See also ==
- Geology of the Grand Canyon area
- Stratigraphy
- Marine transgression
