= Manu Temple =

Landform in the Grand Canyon, Arizona

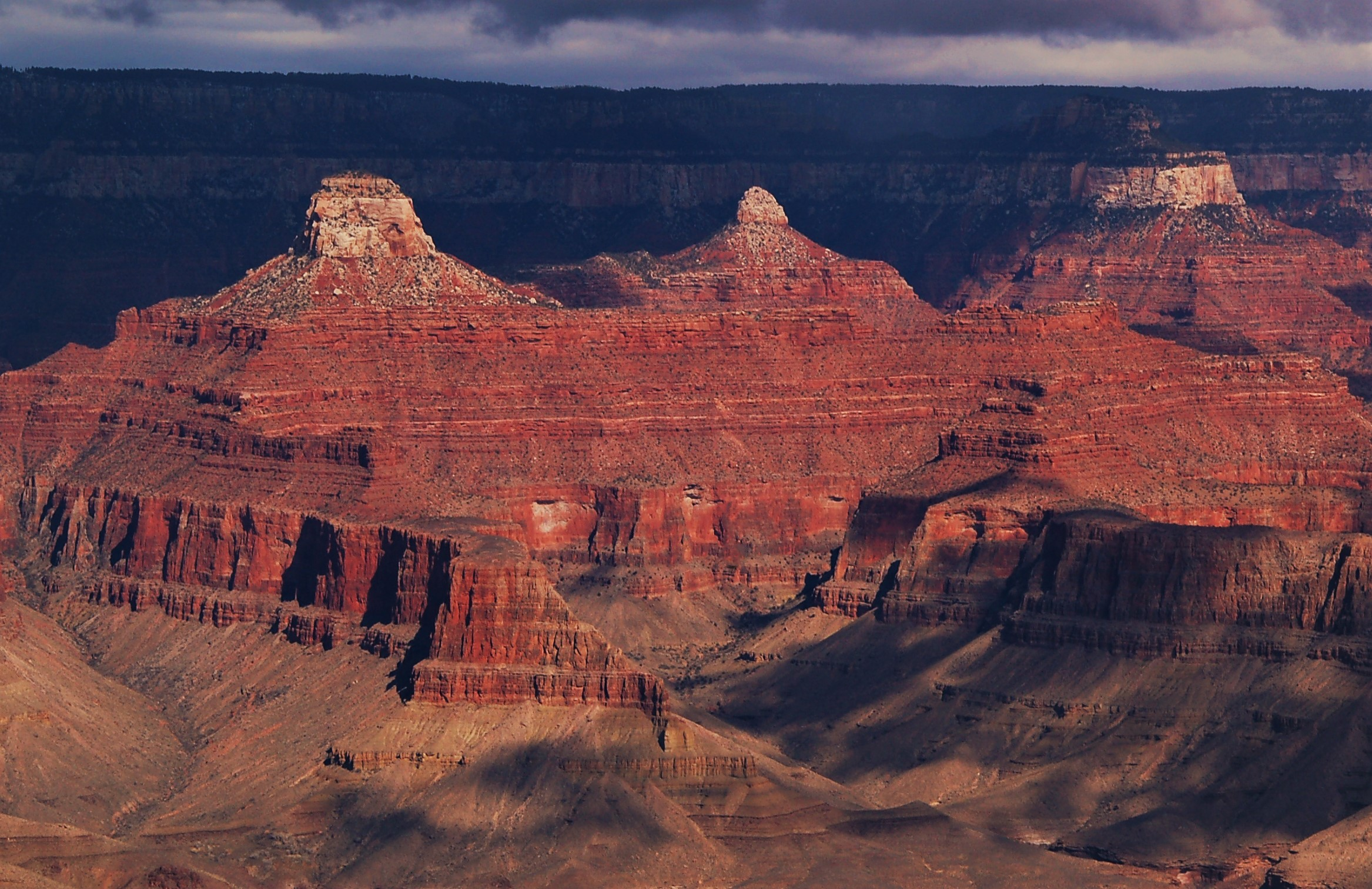
- Manu Temple centered, south aspect (Buddha Temple left, Oza Butte upper right)

Highest point
- Elevation: 7,184 ft (2,190 m)
- Prominence: 524 ft (160 m)
- Parent peak: Buddha Temple (7,212 ft)
- Isolation: 1.26 mi (2.03 km)
- Coordinates: 36°10′00″N 112°05′02″W

Geography
- Location within Arizona Location within the United States
- Country: United States
- State: Arizona
- County: Coconino
- Protected area: Grand Canyon National Park
- Parent range: Kaibab Plateau; Colorado Plateau
- Topo map: USGS Bright Angel Point

Geology
- Rock type(s): sandstone, limestone, mudstone

Climbing
- Easiest route: class 4 climbing

Manu Temple is a 7,184-foot-elevation (2,190-meter) summit located in the Grand Canyon, in Coconino County of northern Arizona, United States. It is situated one mile south of the North Rim's Widforss Point, 1.5 miles (2.4 km) northeast of parent Buddha Temple, and three miles southwest of the North Rim's Bright Angel Point. Topographic relief is significant as it rises nearly 3,600 feet (1,100 meters) in two miles above Bright Angel Canyon to the east, and 2,200 feet in less than one mile above Haunted Canyon to the immediate west. Its neighbors include Brahma Temple and Deva Temple to the east on the opposite side of Bright Angel Canyon. From the South Rim of the canyon it may be difficult to discern Manu Temple from the walls of the Kaibab Plateau one mile behind it, but when the lighting and atmosphere are favorable, this butte of great proportions can be seen clearly defined.

Manu Temple was named by George Wharton James for the Hindu lawgiver Manu, in keeping with Clarence Dutton's practice of naming features in the Grand Canyon after mythological deities. This geographical feature's name was officially adopted in 1906 by the U.S. Board on Geographic Names.

According to the Köppen climate classification system, Manu Temple is located in a Cold semi-arid climate zone. Precipitation runoff from Manu Temple drains south into the Colorado River via Bright Angel Creek on its east side, and Phantom Creek on the west side.

== Geology ==
The summit of Manu Temple is composed of cream-colored, cliff-forming, Permian Coconino Sandstone, which is the third-youngest of the strata in the Grand Canyon, and deposited 265 million years ago as sand dunes. Below the Coconino Sandstone is slope-forming, Permian Hermit Formation, which in turn overlays the Pennsylvanian-Permian Supai Group. Further down are strata of Mississippian Redwall Limestone, Cambrian Tonto Group, and finally Proterozoic Unkar Group at creek level.

== See also ==
- Geology of the Grand Canyon area

== Gallery ==
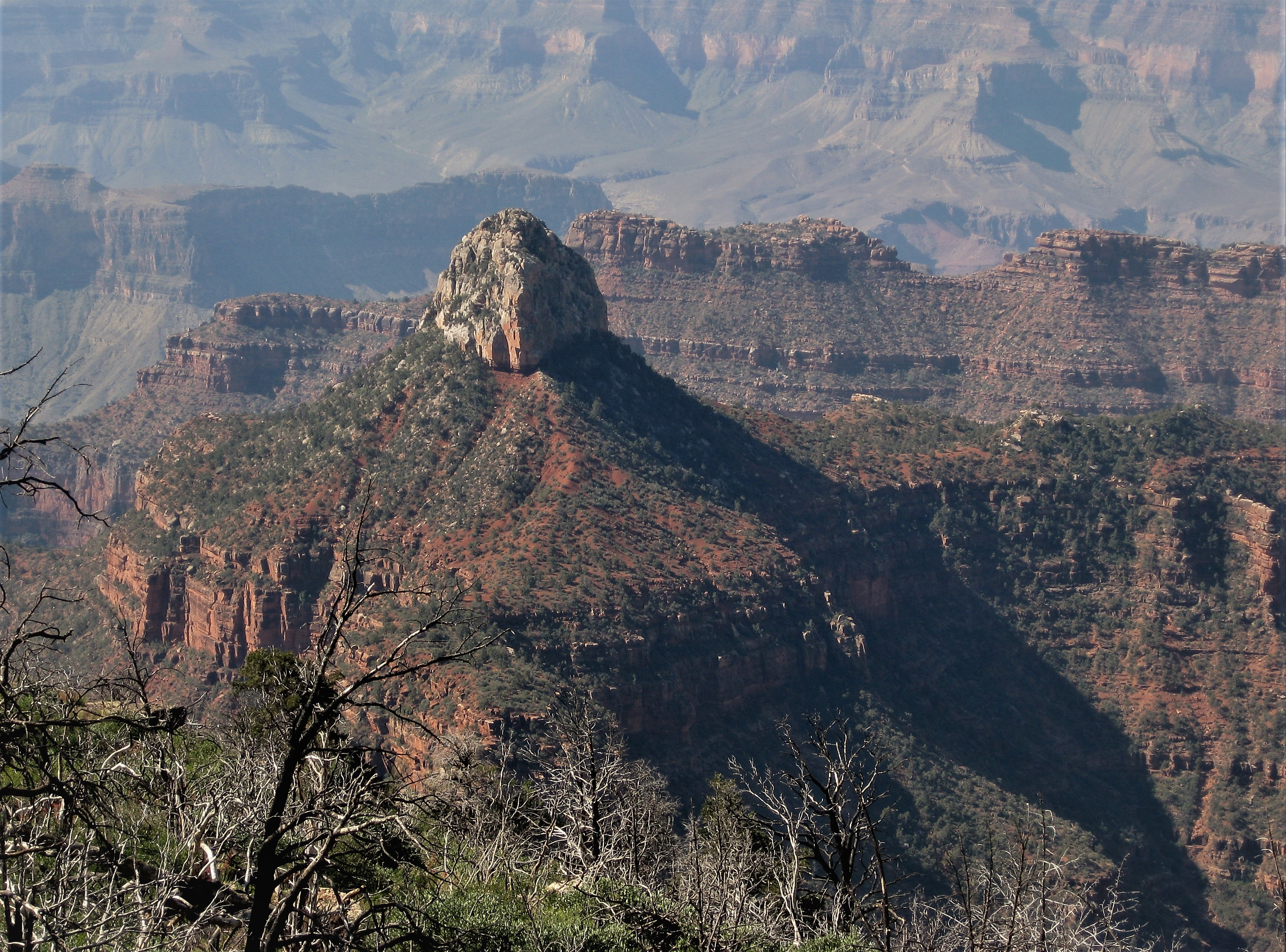
Manu Temple from Widforss Point

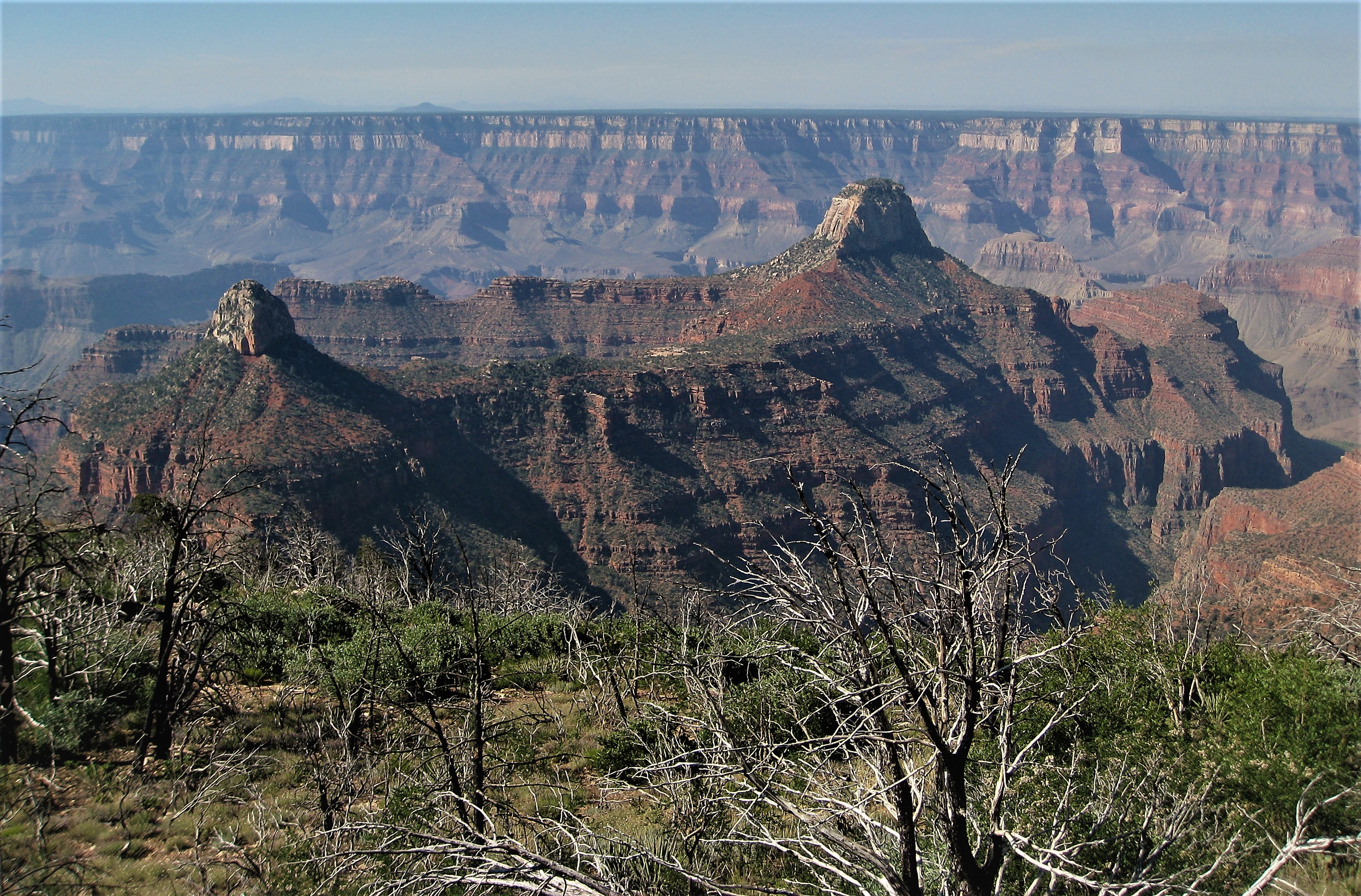
Buddha Temple and Manu Temple (left) from Widforss Point

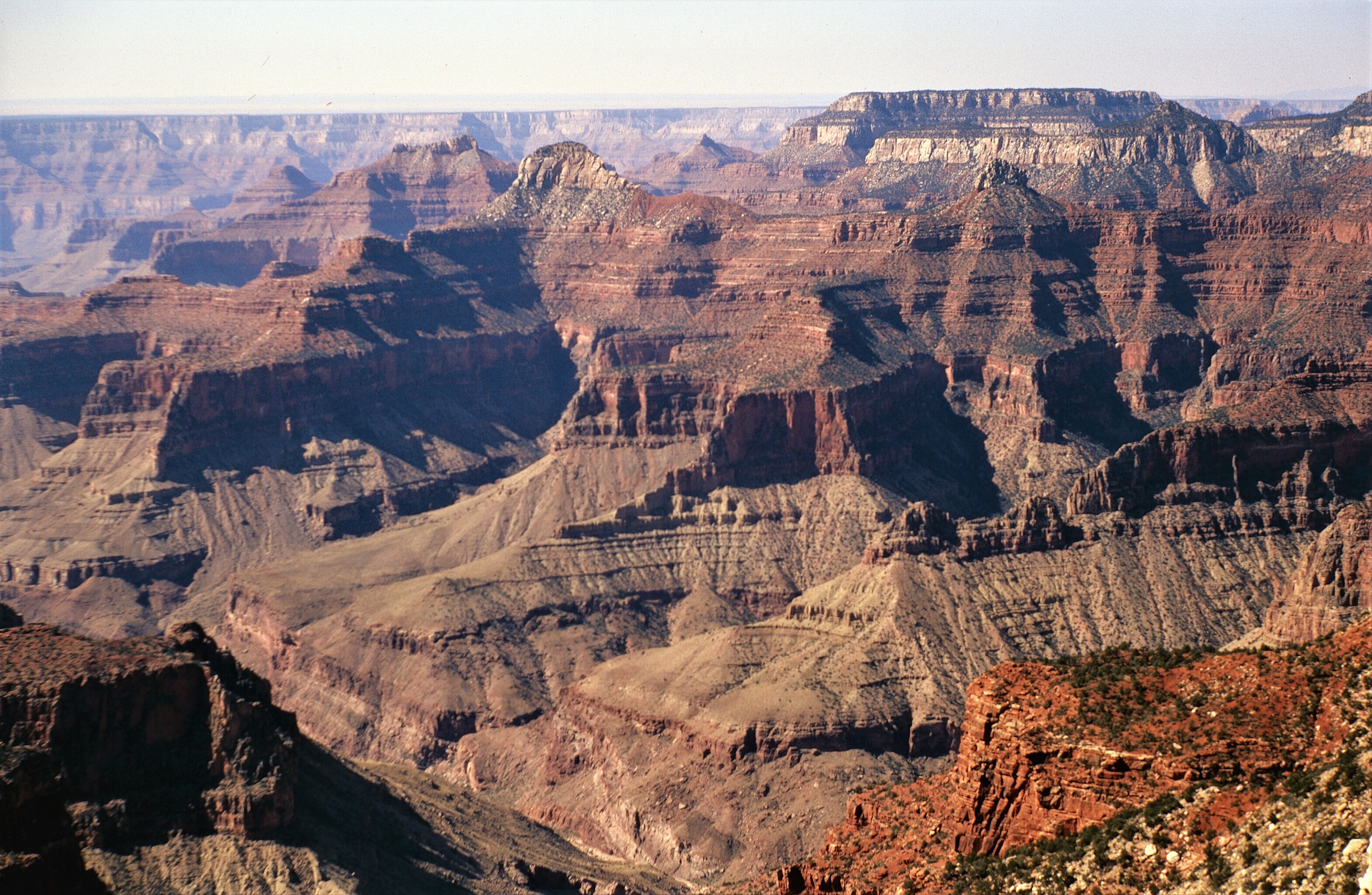
Buddha and Manu Temples, east aspect from Komo Point.
