= Deva Temple =

Landform in the Grand Canyon, Arizona

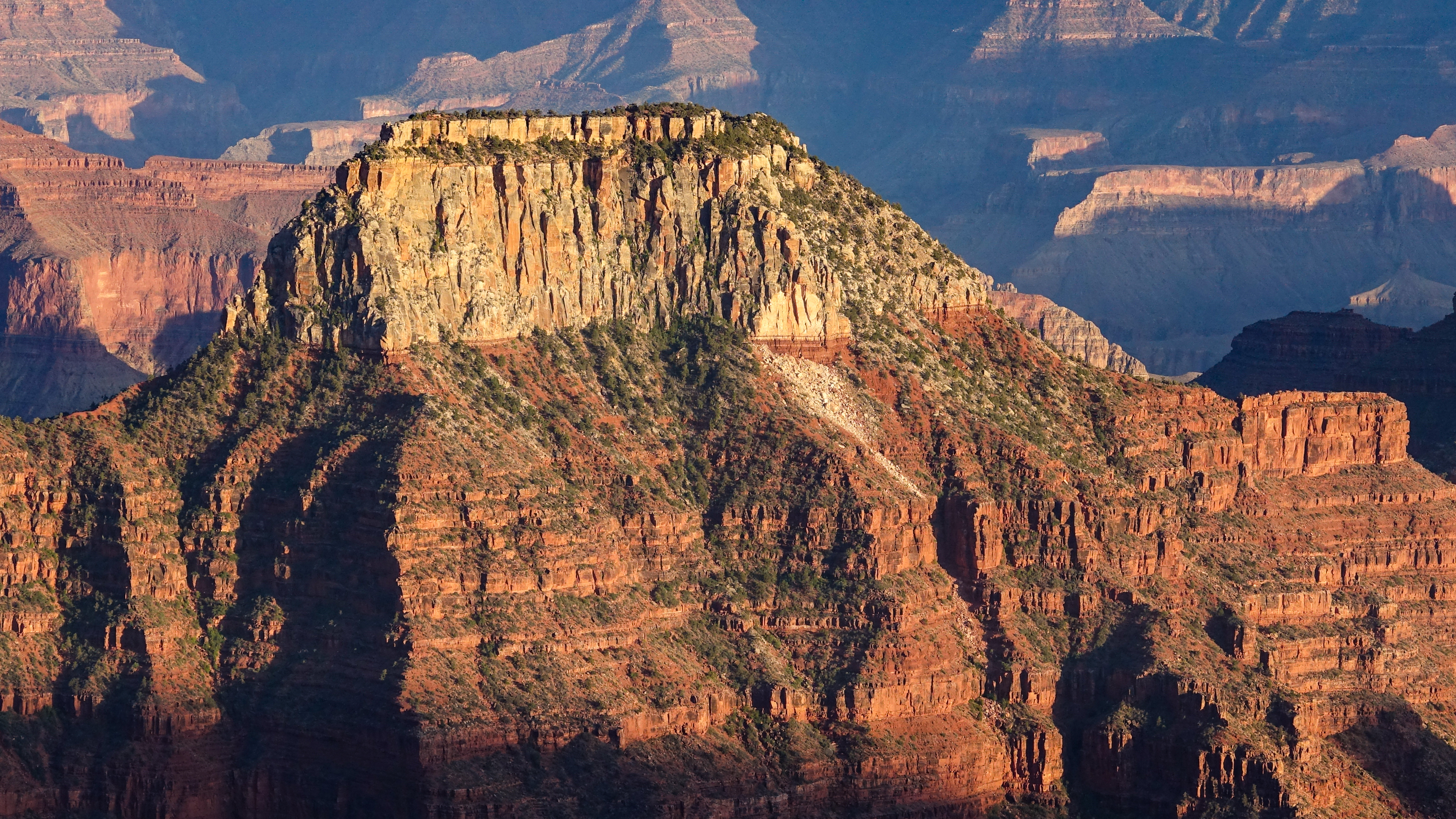
- North aspect at sunset

Highest point
- Elevation: 7,353 ft (2,241 m)
- Prominence: 693 ft (211 m)
- Parent peak: Brahma Temple (7,551 ft)
- Isolation: 1.56 mi (2.51 km)
- Coordinates: 36°09′08″N 112°01′54″W

Geography
- Location within Arizona Location within the United States
- Country: United States
- State: Arizona
- County: Coconino
- Protected area: Grand Canyon National Park
- Parent range: Kaibab Plateau; Colorado Plateau
- Topo map: USGS Bright Angel Point

Geology
- Rock type: Coconino Sandstone

Climbing
- First ascent: July 17, 1959 Harvey Butchart

Deva Temple is a 7,353-foot-elevation (2,241-meter) summit located in the Grand Canyon, in Coconino County of northern Arizona, USA. It is situated three miles south of the North Rim's Bright Angel Point, and towers 3,700 feet (1,100 meters) above Bright Angel Canyon. Its nearest higher neighbor is Brahma Temple, 1.5 mile to the south. Other neighbors include Zoroaster Temple 2.5 miles to the south-southwest, Manu Temple three miles to the west-northwest, and Buddha Temple, 3.5 miles to the west. Deva Temple was named by Henry Gannett, a geographer for Clarence Dutton, in following Dutton's practice of naming features in the Grand Canyon after mythological deities, in this case, Deva. This geographical feature's name was officially adopted in 1906 by the U.S. Board on Geographic Names. According to the Köppen climate classification system, Deva Temple is located in a Cold semi-arid climate zone.

== Geology ==
The summit of Deva Temple is composed of cream-colored, cliff-forming, Permian Coconino Sandstone with a small, remnant Kaibab Limestone caprock. The sandstone, which is the third-youngest of the strata in the Grand Canyon, was deposited 265 million years ago as sand dunes. Below the Coconino Sandstone is slope-forming, Permian Hermit Formation, which in turn overlays the Pennsylvanian-Permian Supai Group. Further down are strata of Mississippian Redwall Limestone, Cambrian Tonto Group, and finally Proterozoic Unkar Group at creek level. Precipitation runoff from Deva Temple drains south into the Colorado River via Bright Angel Creek on its west side, and Clear Creek on the east side.

== Gallery ==
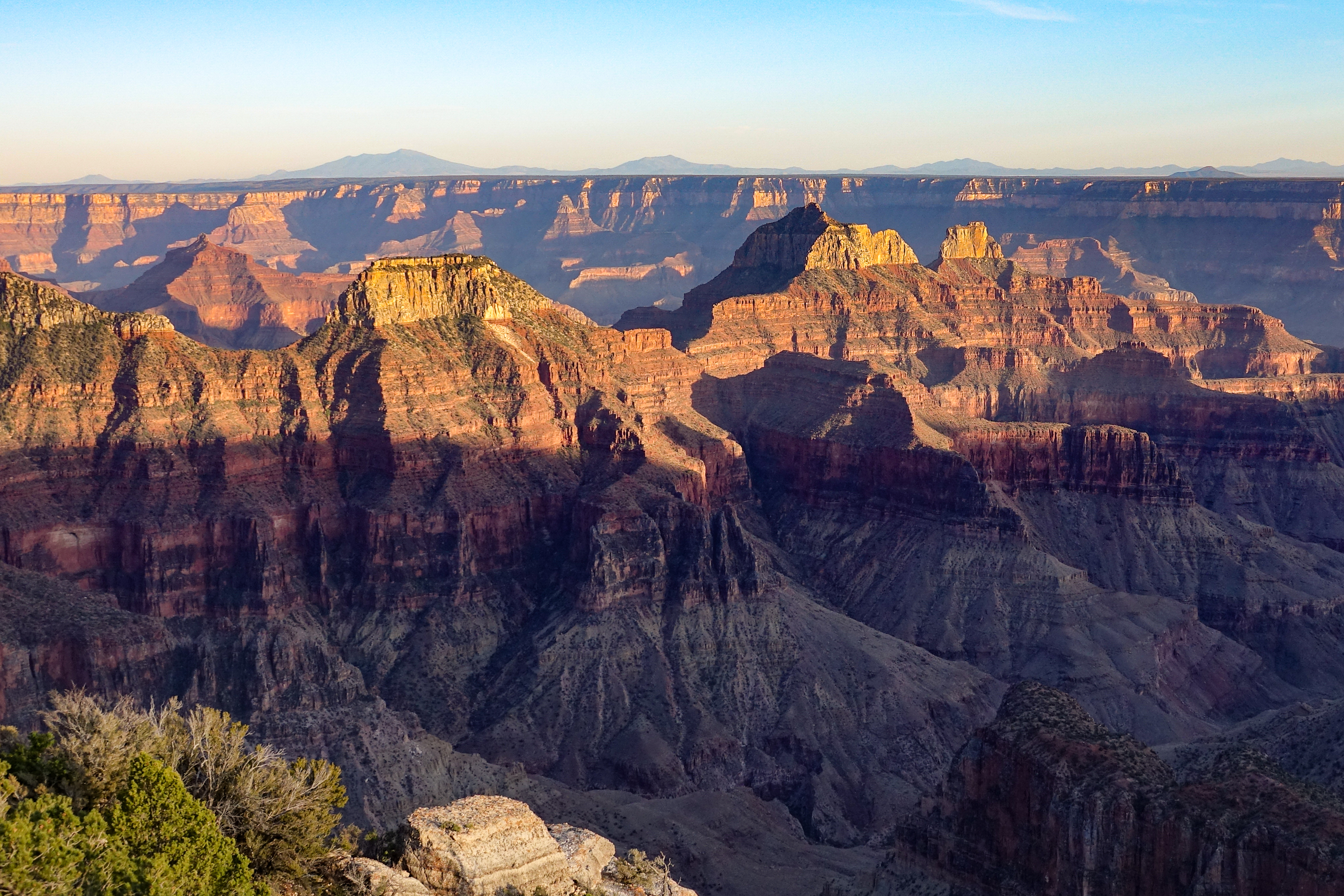
Deva Temple (left of center), Brahma and Zoroaster Temples (right) seen from the North Rim at Bright Angel Point

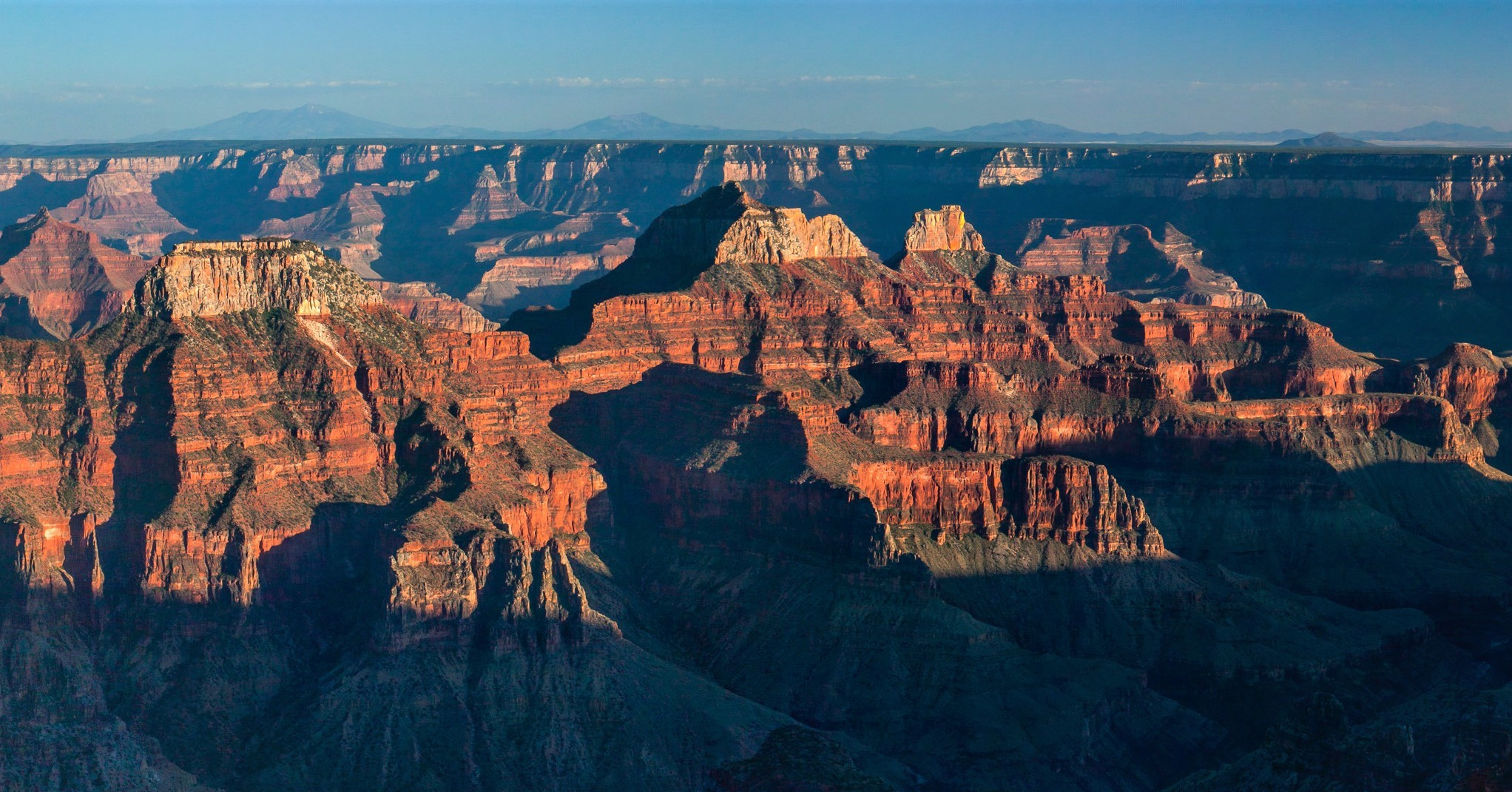
Deva (left), Brahma (center), and Zoroaster Temples seen from North Rim

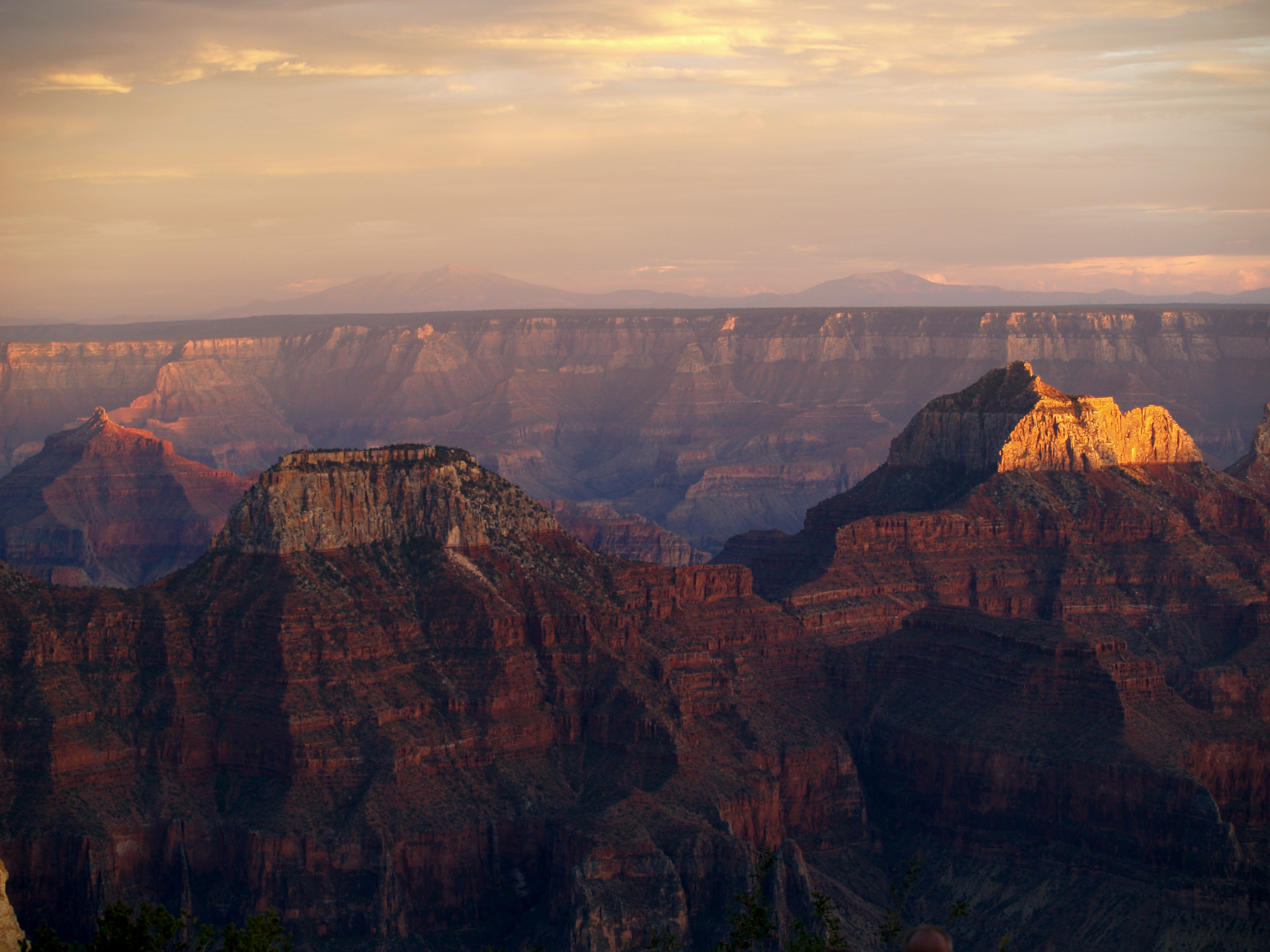
Deva Temple (left), Brahma Temple (right)

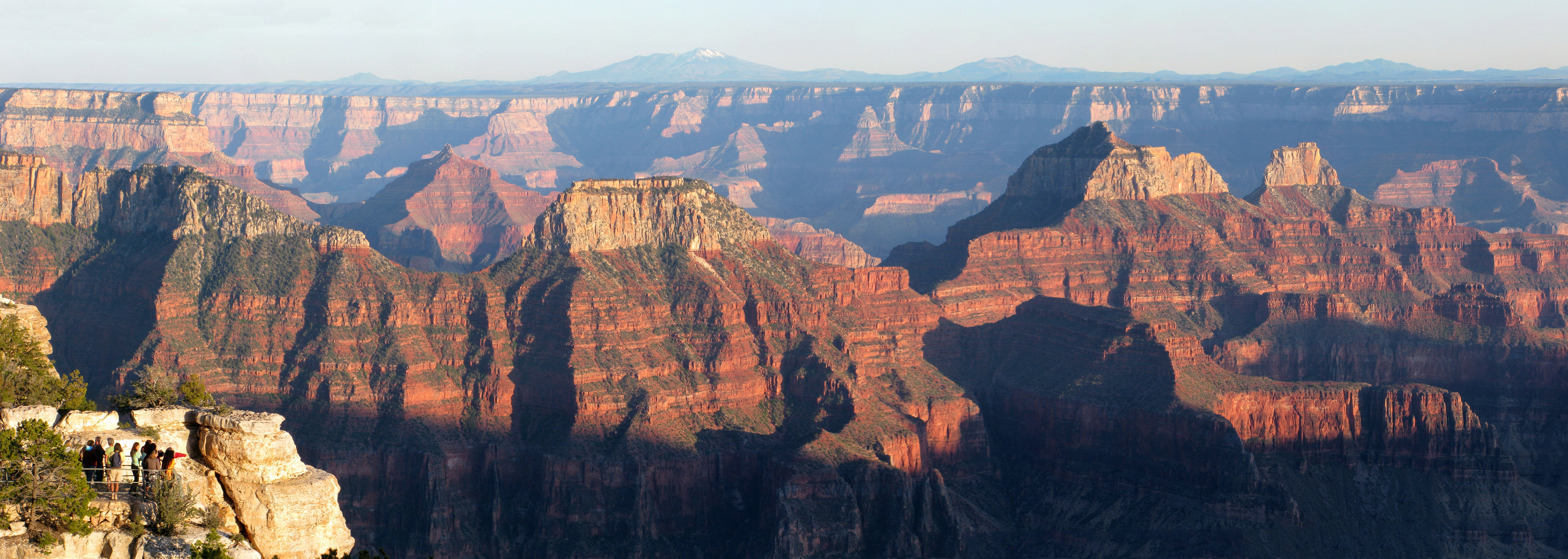
Deva Temple (left of center), Brahma and Zoroaster Temples (right) seen from the North Rim at Bright Angel Point

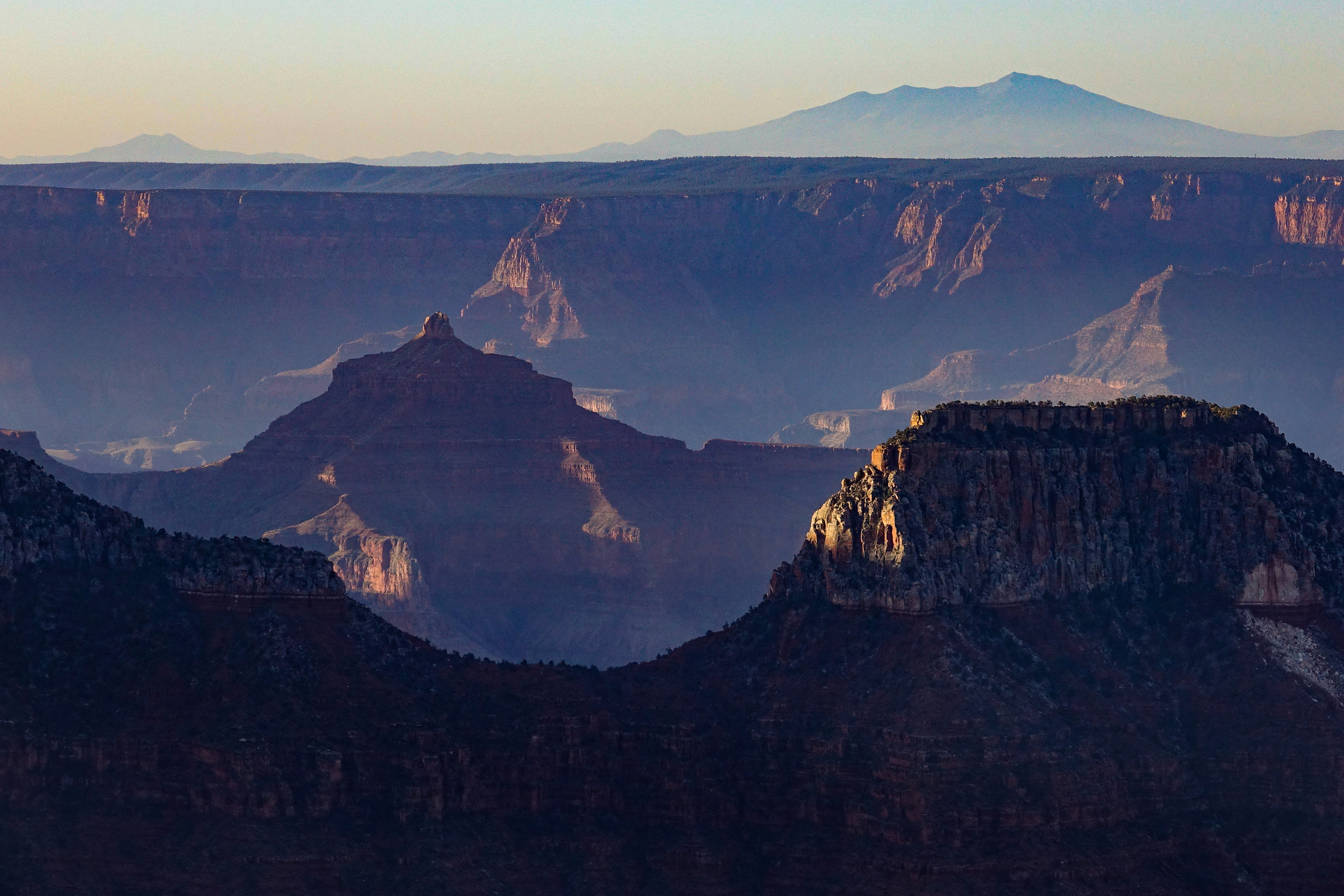
Angels Gate (left) and Deva Temple (right)

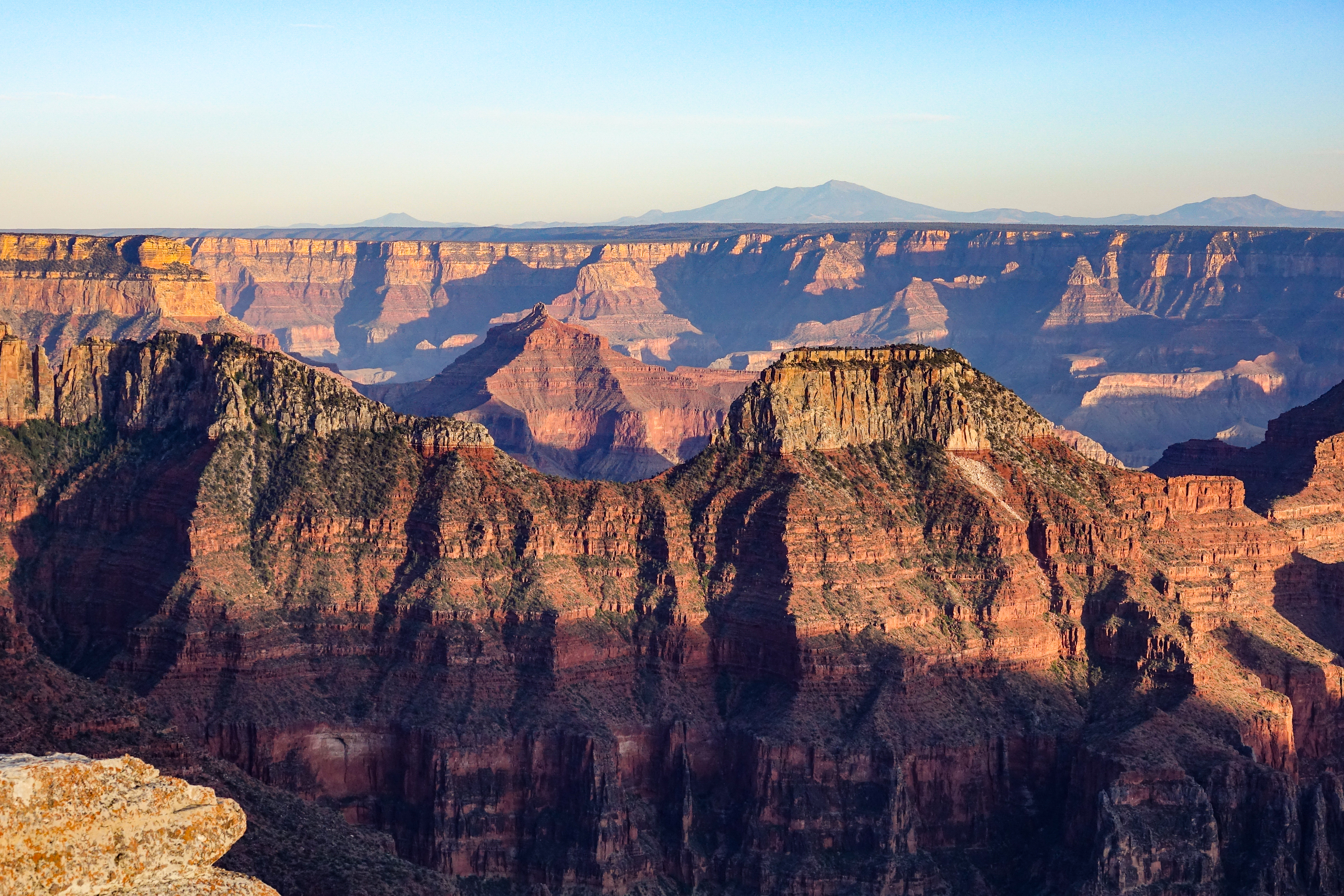
Wotans Throne, Angels Gate, and Deva Temple

== See also ==
- Geology of the Grand Canyon area
