= Buddha Temple (Grand Canyon) =

Landform in the Grand Canyon, Arizona

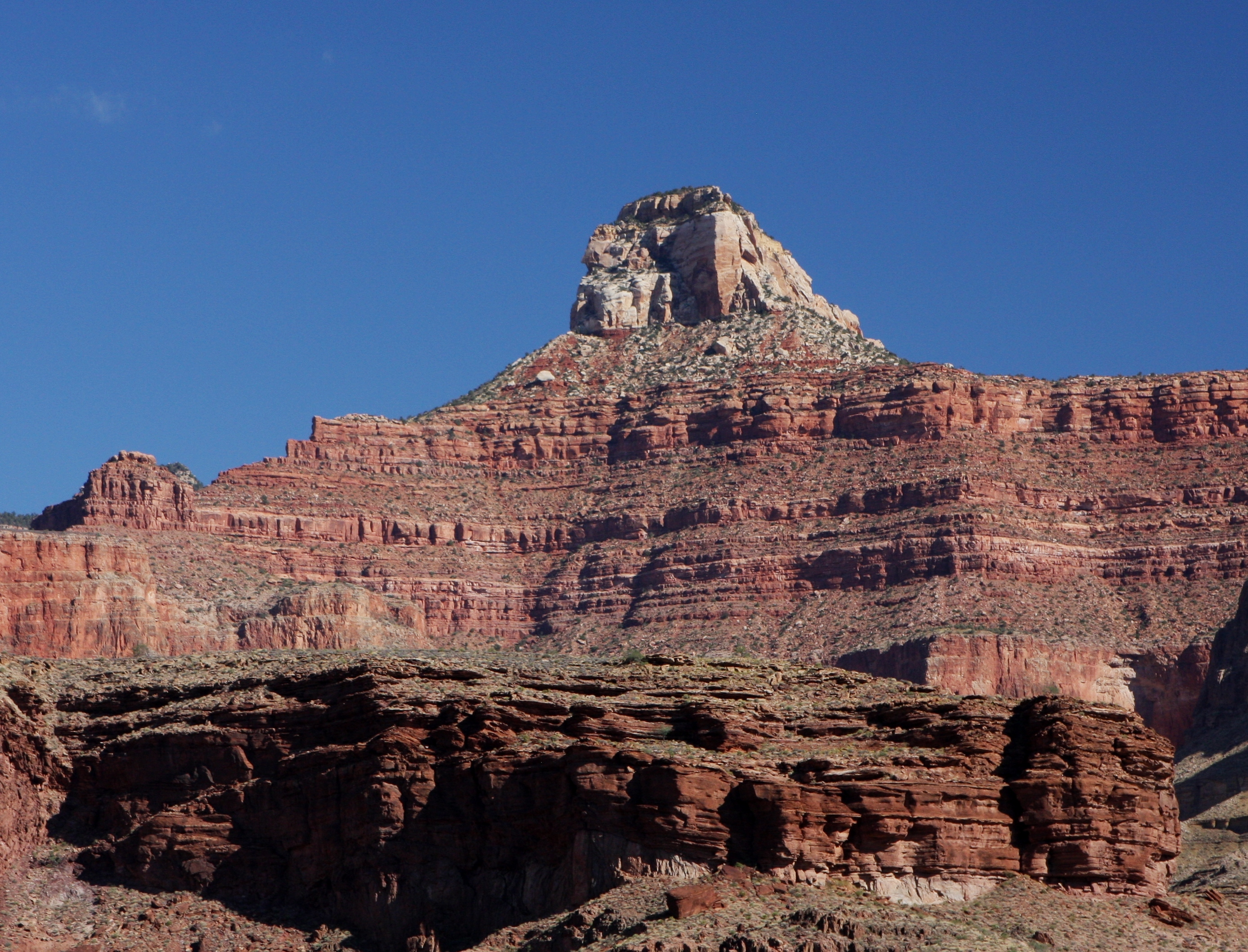
- South aspect

Highest point
- Elevation: 7,212 ft (2,198 m)
- Prominence: 766 ft (233 m)
- Parent peak: The Colonnade (7,602 ft)
- Isolation: 1.46 mi (2.35 km)
- Coordinates: 36°09′10″N 112°05′55″W

Geography
- Location within Arizona Location within the United States
- Country: United States
- State: Arizona
- County: Coconino
- Protected area: Grand Canyon National Park
- Parent range: Kaibab Plateau; Colorado Plateau
- Topo map: USGS Bright Angel Point

Geology
- Rock type(s): limestone, sandstone, mudstone

Climbing
- First ascent: 1973
- Easiest route: class 5.4 climbing

Buddha Temple is a 7,212-foot-elevation (2,198-meter) summit located in the Grand Canyon, in Coconino County of northern Arizona, in the Southwestern United States. It is situated 6.5 miles (10.5 km) due north of the Mather Point overlook on the canyon's South Rim, and four miles southwest of the North Rim's Bright Angel Point. Topographic relief is significant as it rises over 3,800 feet (1,200 meters) in two miles above Bright Angel Canyon to the east, and 3,000 feet in less than one mile above Haunted Canyon to the immediate west. Its neighbors include Manu Temple 1.5 miles (2.4 km) to the northeast, Isis Temple 2.3 miles to the southwest, Zoroaster Temple 3.8 miles to the southeast, and Deva Temple, 3.5 miles to the east. Buddha Temple was named by Henry Gannett, a geographer for Clarence Dutton, in following Dutton's practice of naming features in the Grand Canyon after mythological deities, in this case Buddha. This geographical feature's name was officially adopted in 1906 by the U.S. Board on Geographic Names. The first ascent of this butte was made in 1973 by Bruce Grubbs, Chauncey Parker, and Mark Brown via the Northwest Arete. According to the Köppen climate classification system, Buddha Temple is located in a Cold semi-arid climate zone.

== Geology ==
The summit of Buddha Temple is composed of Kaibab Limestone caprock overlaying cream-colored, cliff-forming, Permian Coconino Sandstone. The sandstone, which is the third-youngest of the strata in the Grand Canyon, was deposited 265 million years ago as sand dunes. Below the Coconino Sandstone is slope-forming, Permian Hermit Formation, which in turn overlays the Pennsylvanian-Permian Supai Group. Further down are strata of Mississippian Redwall Limestone, Cambrian Tonto Group, and finally Proterozoic Unkar Group at creek level and Granite Gorge. Precipitation runoff from Buddha Temple drains south into the Colorado River via Bright Angel Creek on its east side, and Phantom Creek on the west side.

== Gallery ==
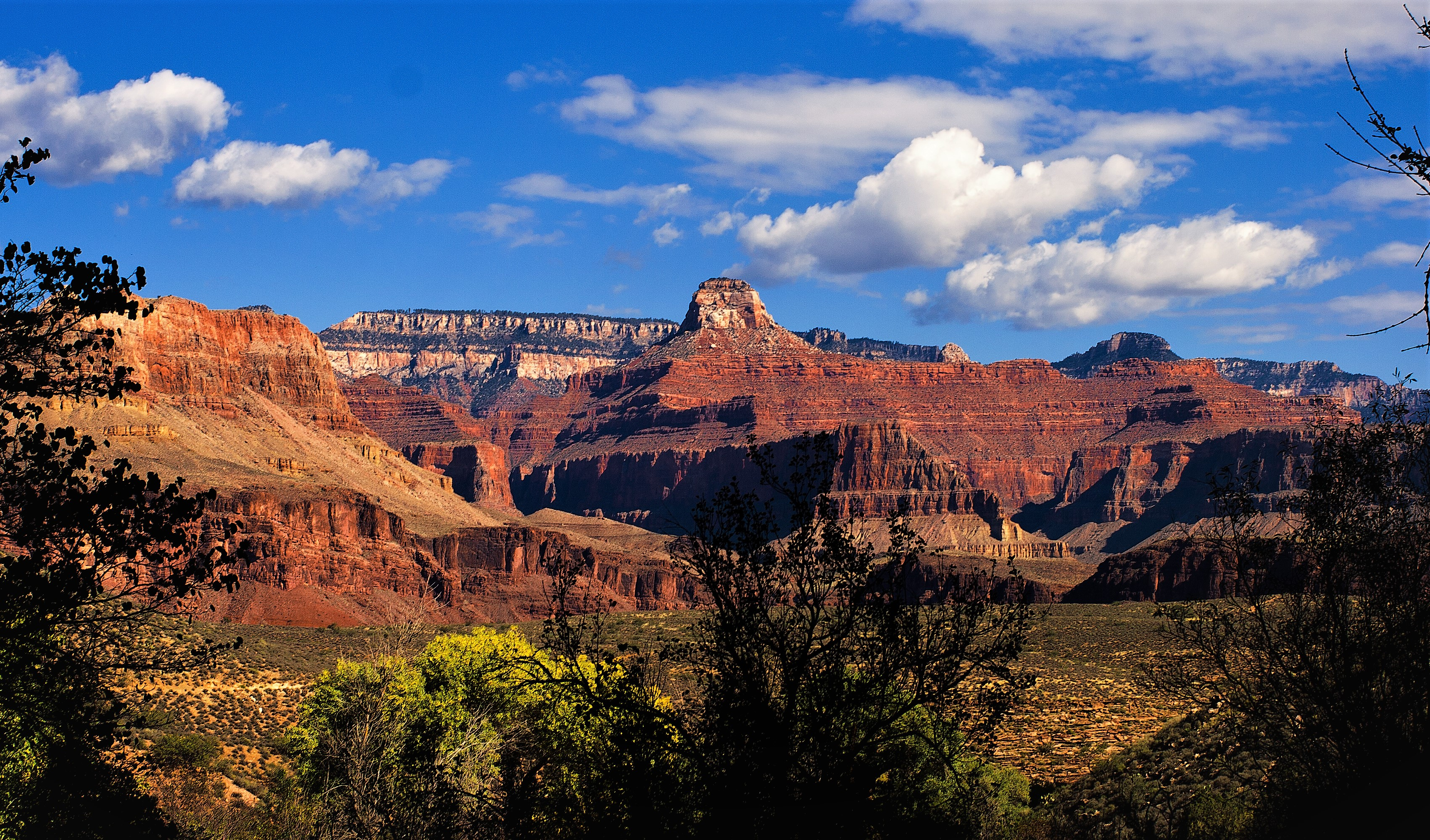

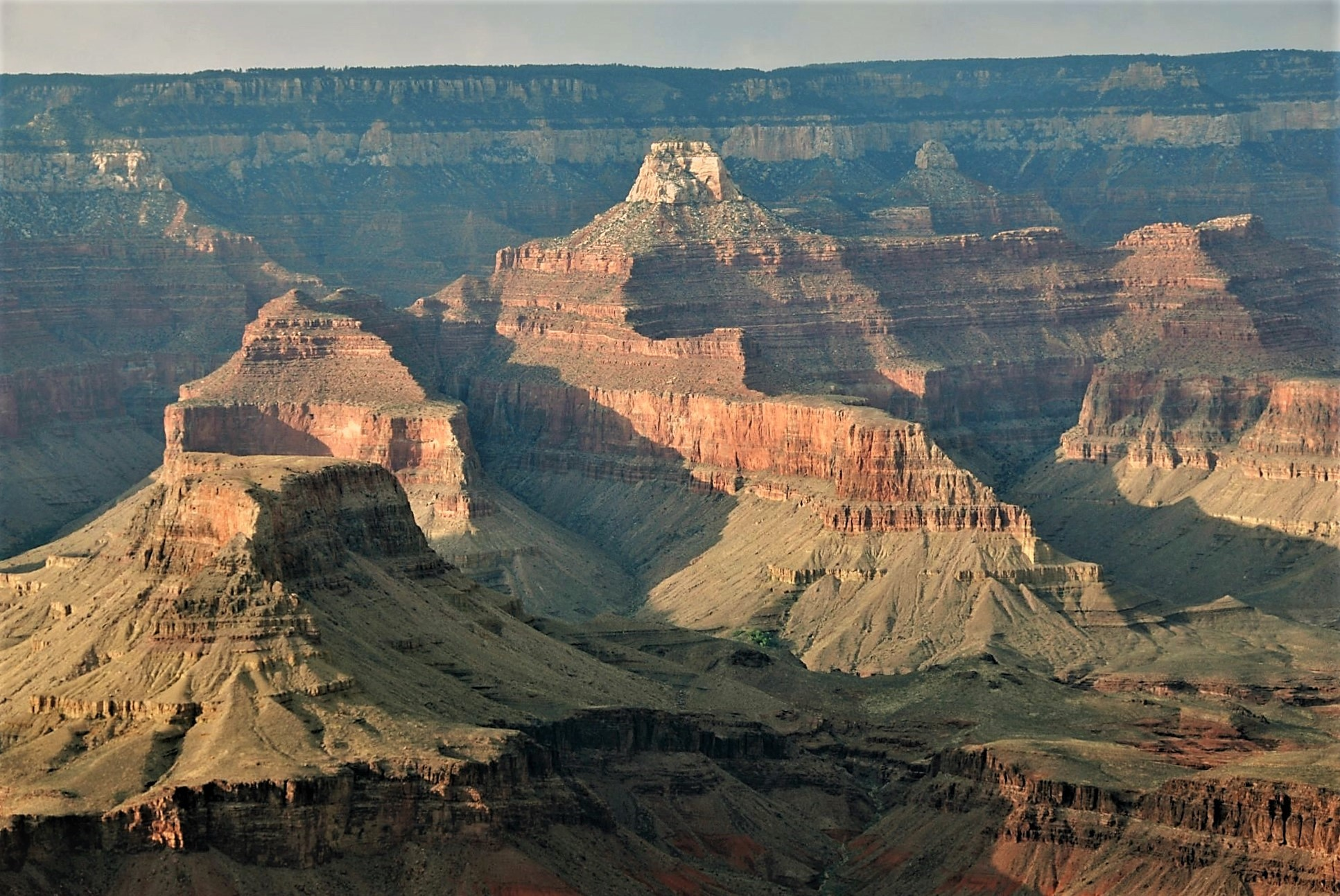

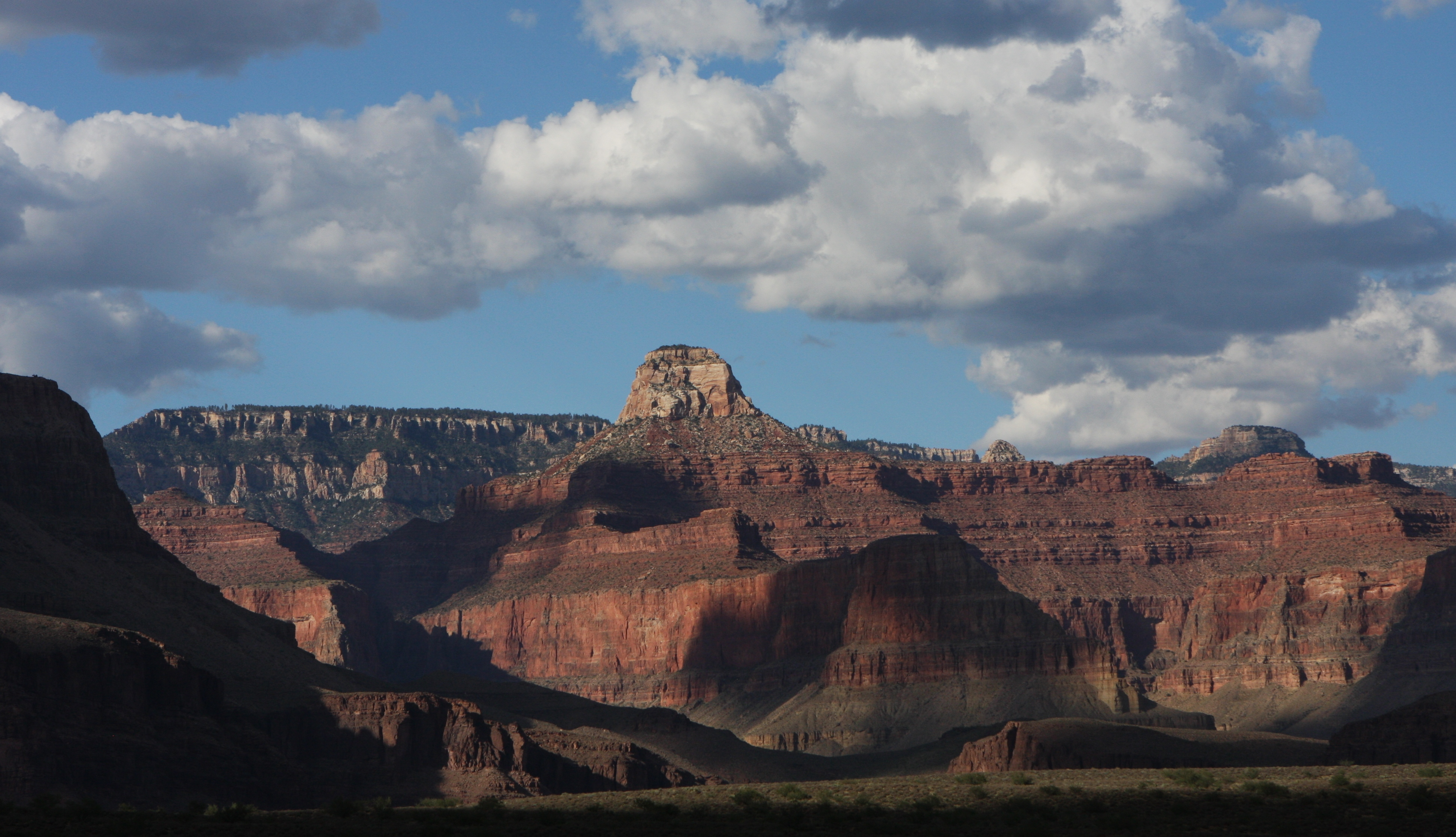

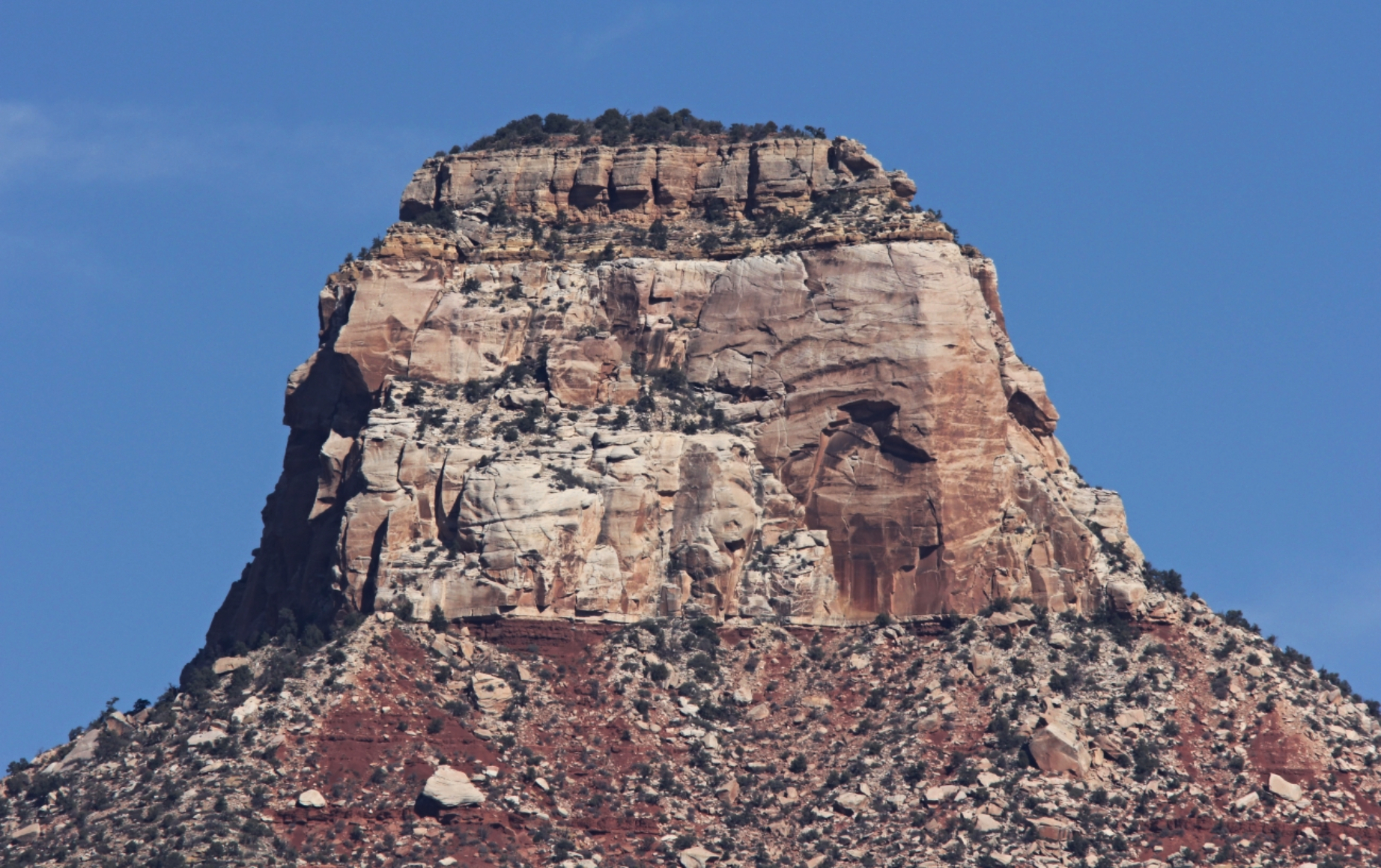
Buddha Temple detail

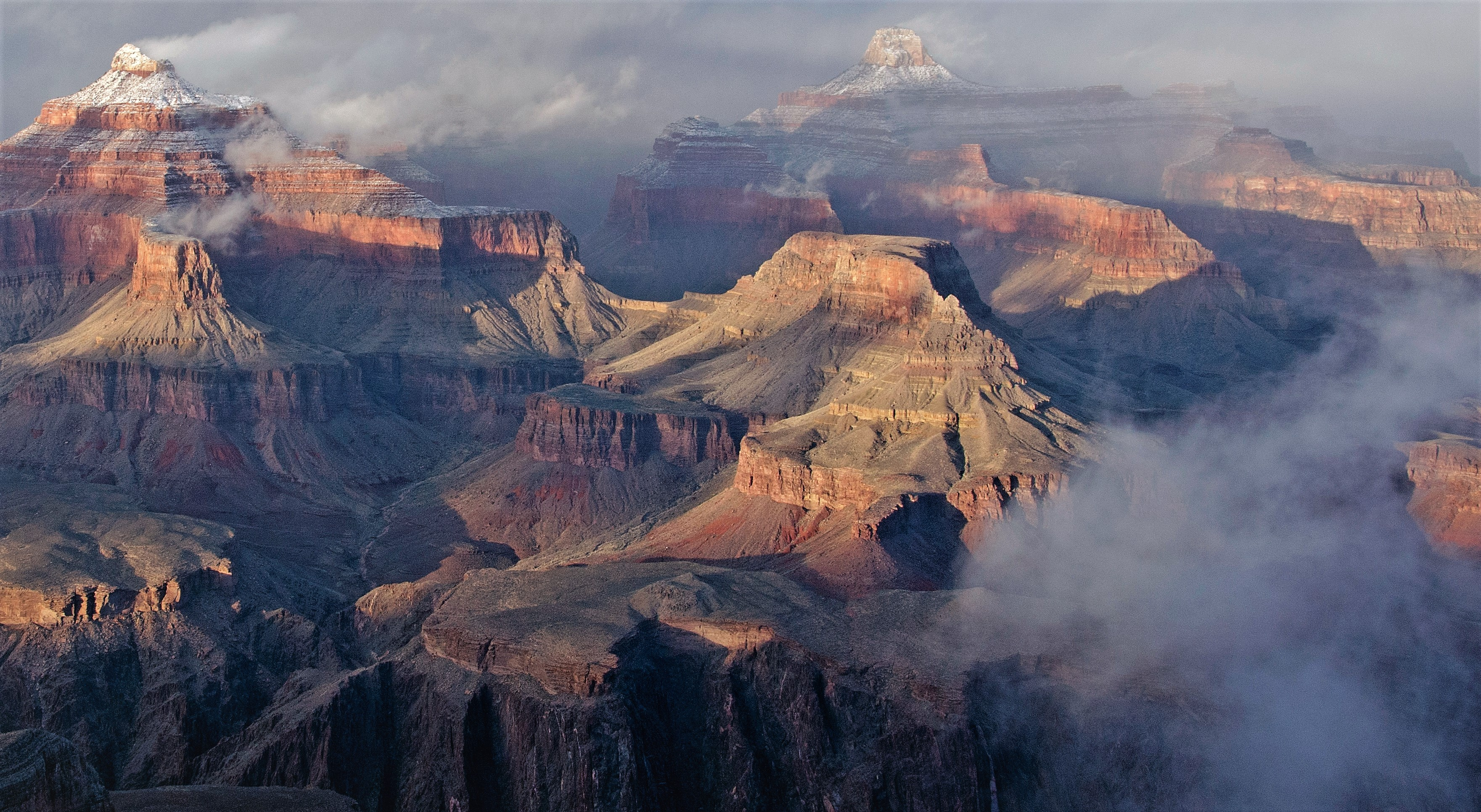
Isis Temple left, Cheops Pyramid in front, Buddha Temple right of center in back.

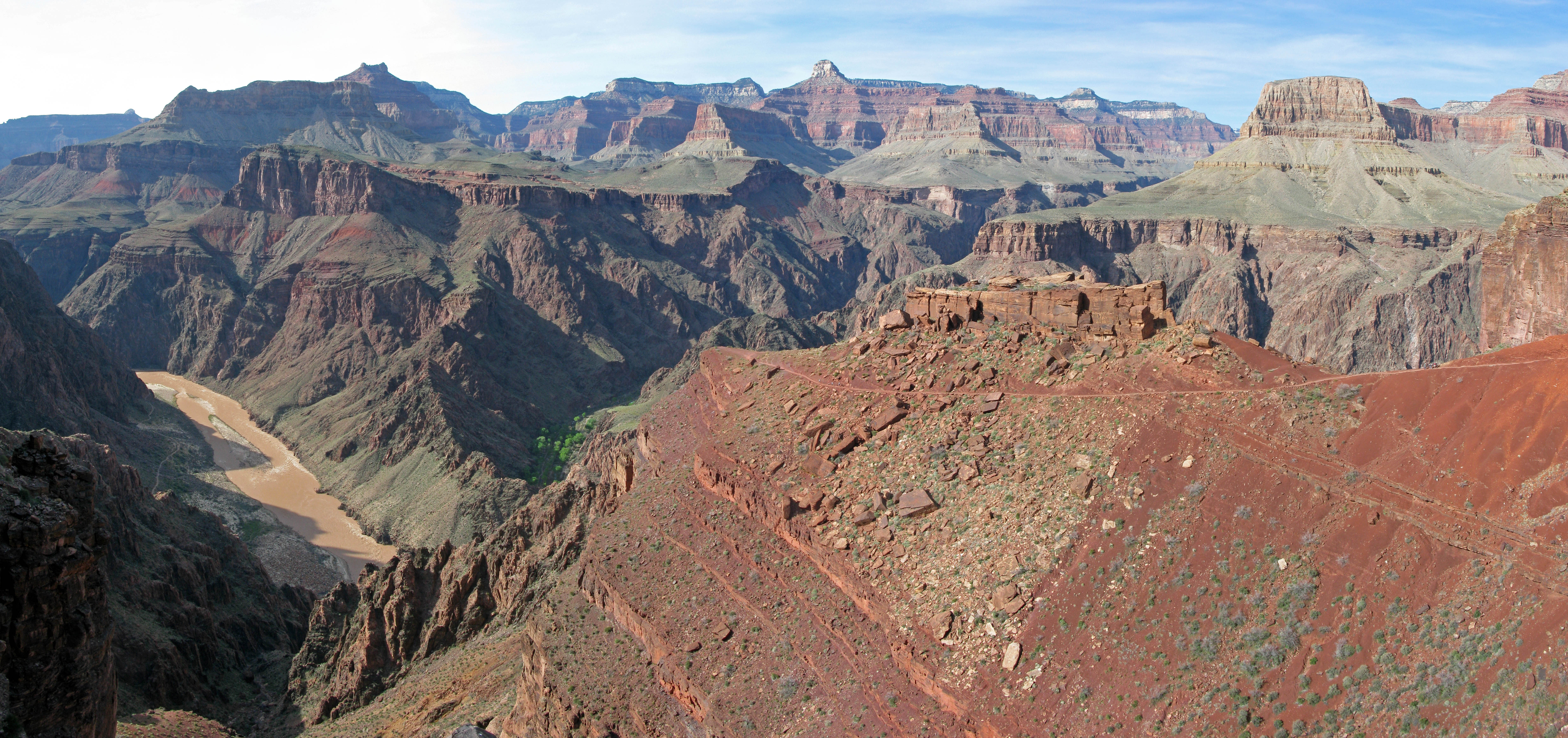
Buddha Temple centered in back

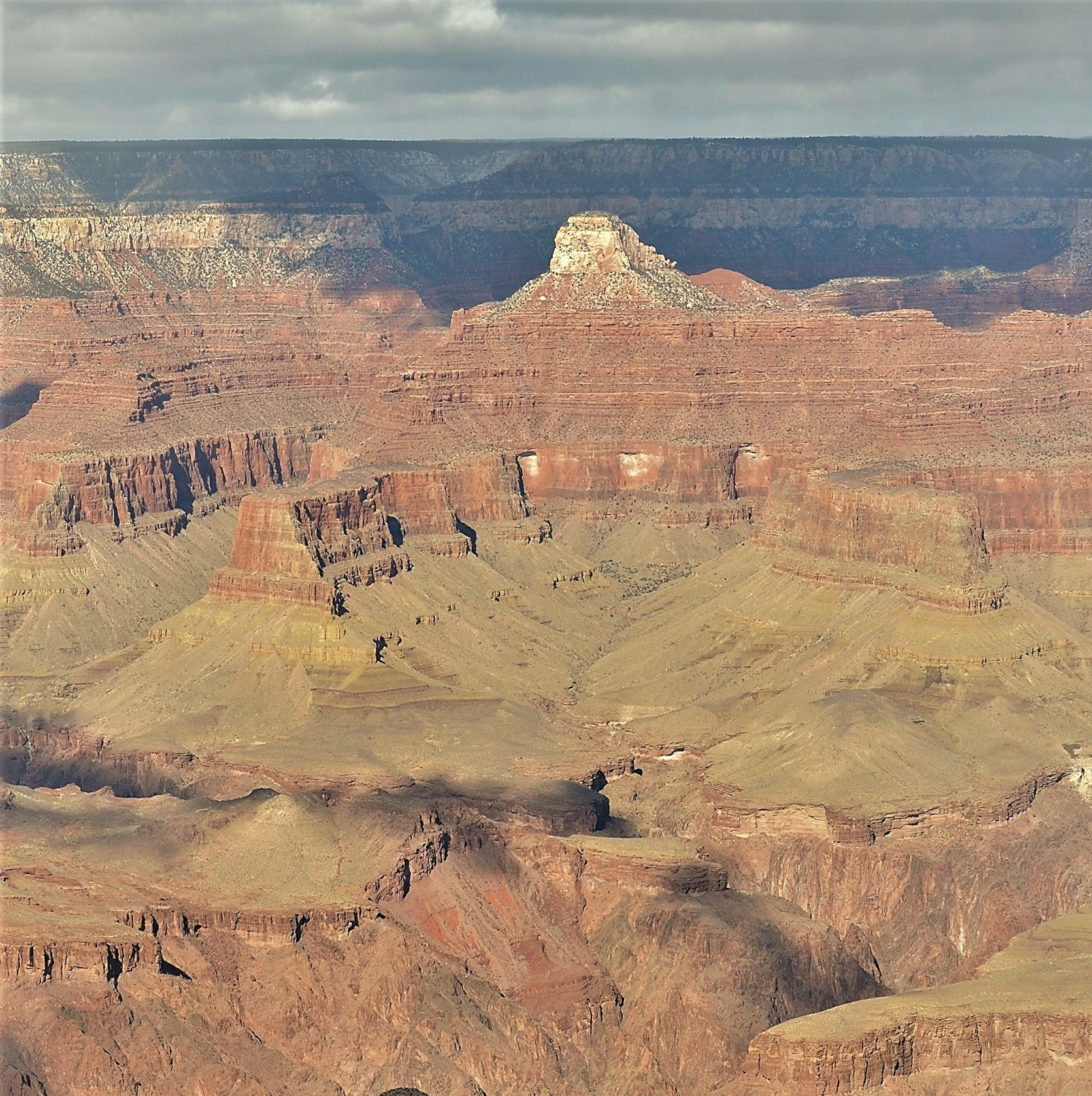
Buddha Temple from Yaki Point

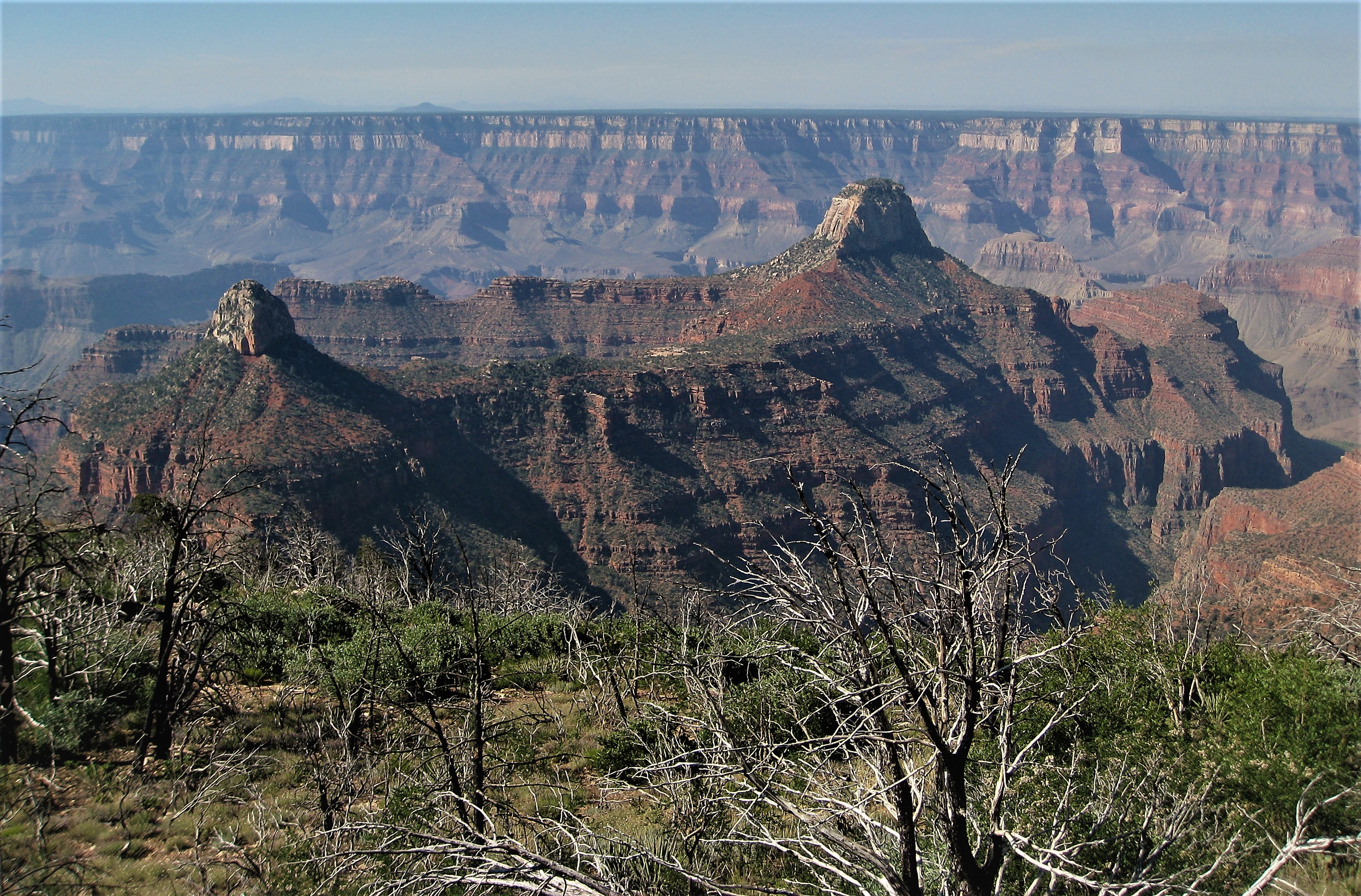
Buddha Temple and Manu Temple (left) from Widforss Point

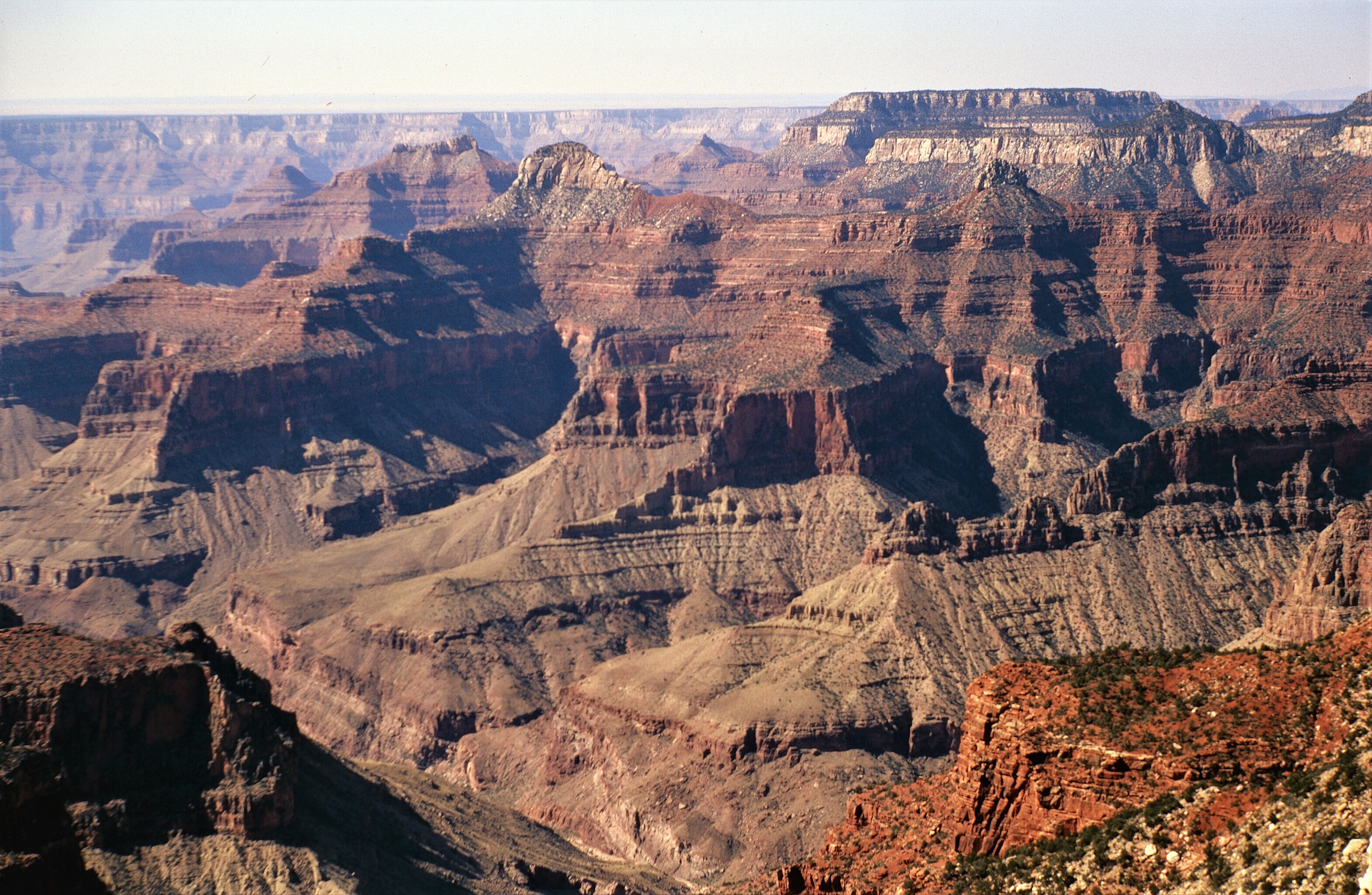
Buddha and Manu Temples, east aspect from Komo Point.

== See also ==
- Geology of the Grand Canyon area
