= Brahma Temple (Grand Canyon) =

Landform in the Grand Canyon, Arizona

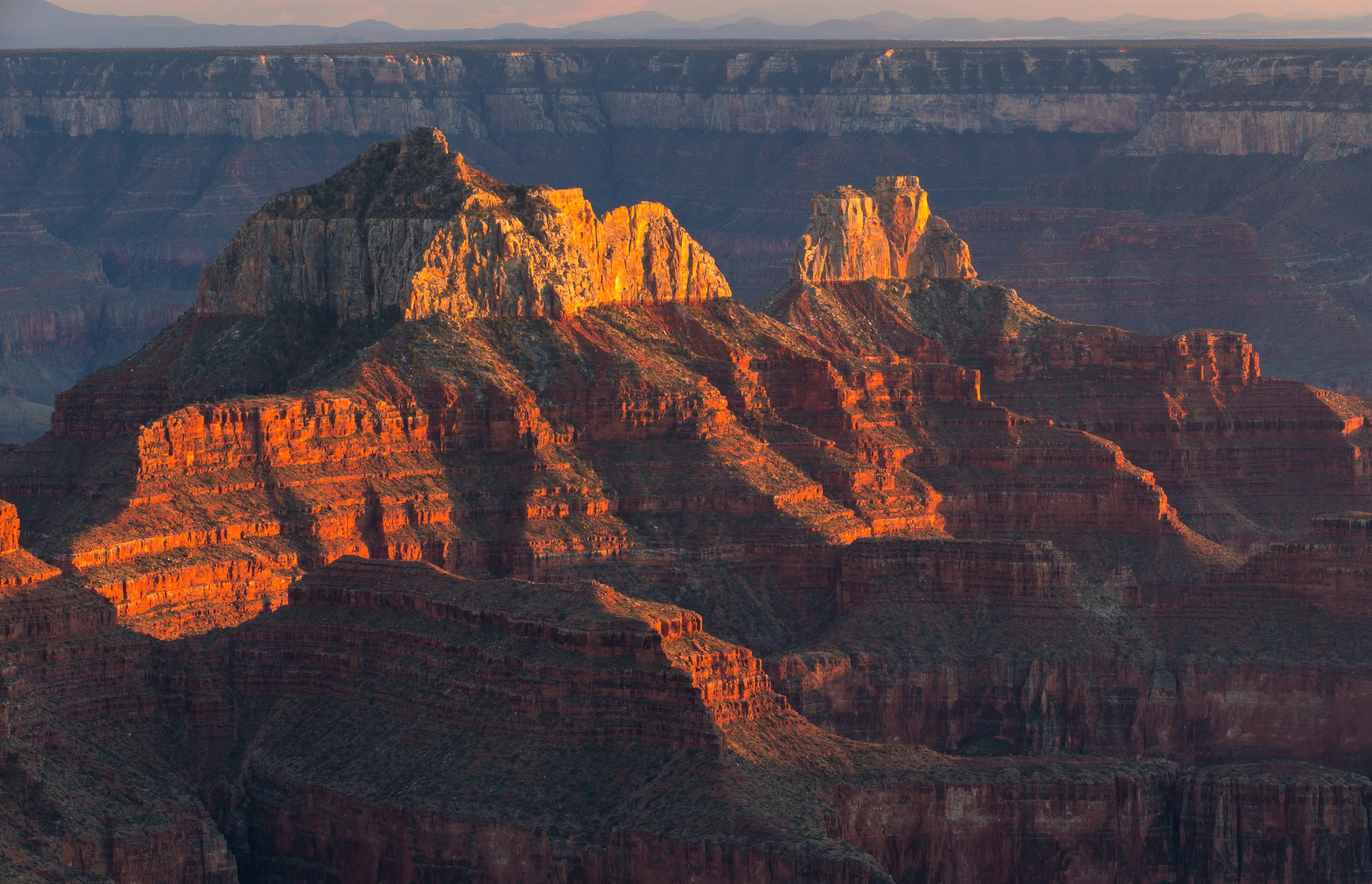
- North aspect at sunset

Highest point
- Elevation: 7,551 ft (2,302 m)
- Prominence: 1,468 ft (447 m)
- Parent peak: Oza Butte (8,068 ft)
- Isolation: 3.97 mi (6.39 km)
- Coordinates: 36°07′50″N 112°02′19″W

Geography
- Location within Arizona Location within the United States
- Country: United States
- State: Arizona
- County: Coconino
- Protected area: Grand Canyon National Park
- Parent range: Kaibab Plateau; Colorado Plateau
- Topo map: USGS Phantom Ranch

Geology
- Rock type: Coconino Sandstone

Climbing
- First ascent: May 15, 1968
- Easiest route: class 4 climbing

Brahma Temple is a 7,551-foot-elevation (2,302-meter) summit located in the Grand Canyon, in Coconino County of Arizona, US. It is situated six miles (9.7 km) north-northeast of the Yavapai Point overlook on the canyon's South Rim, and 4.5 miles south of the North Rim's Bright Angel Point. It towers 5,000 feet (1,500 meters) above Phantom Ranch in Bright Angel Canyon. Its nearest higher neighbor is Oza Butte, four miles to the north-northwest. Other neighbors include Zoroaster Temple one mile to the south, and Deva Temple, 1.5 miles to the north. Brahma Temple is named for Brahma, the Hindu creator of the universe. This name was applied by Clarence Dutton who began the tradition of naming geographical features in the Grand Canyon after mythological deities. This geographical feature's name was officially adopted in 1906 by the U.S. Board on Geographic Names.

The first ascent of the summit was made by Donald Davis and Clarence "Doc" Ellis on May 15, 1968. The pair covered 12 miles and climbed 5,071 vertical feet from Phantom Ranch to reach the summit, and returned in 14 hours to complete the accomplishment. According to the Köppen climate classification system, Brahma Temple is located in a Cold semi-arid climate zone.

== Geology ==
The summit of Brahma Temple is composed of cream-colored, cliff-forming, Permian Coconino Sandstone with a Kaibab Limestone caprock. The sandstone, which is the third-youngest of the strata in the Grand Canyon, was deposited 265 million years ago as sand dunes. Below the Coconino Sandstone is slope-forming, Permian Hermit Formation, which in turn overlays the Pennsylvanian-Permian Supai Group, and further down the Mississippian Redwall Limestone layer. Precipitation runoff from Brahma Temple drains south into the Colorado River via Bright Angel Creek on its west side, and Clear Creek on the east side.

== Gallery ==
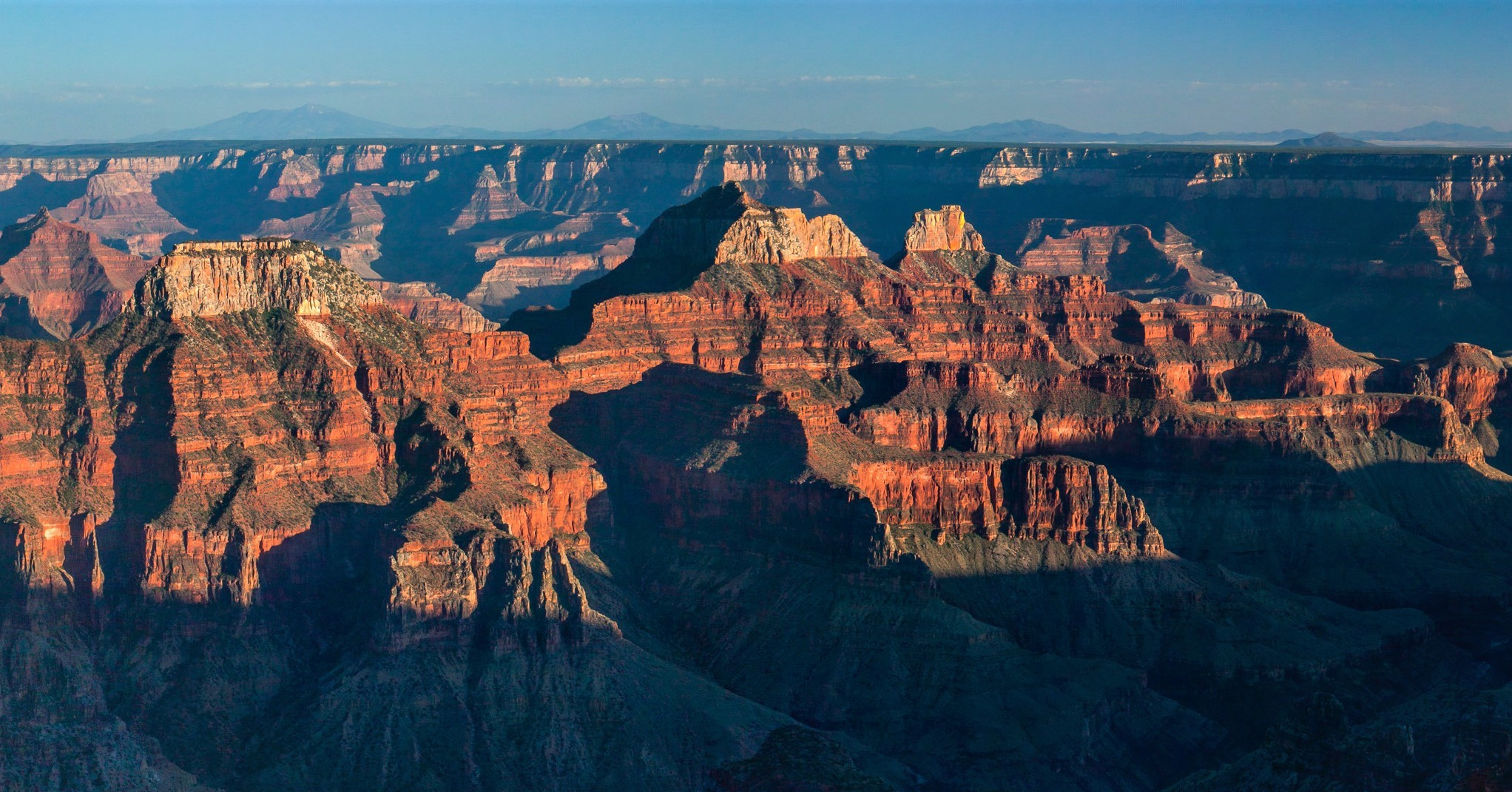
Deva, Brahma (center), and Zoroaster Temples seen from North Rim

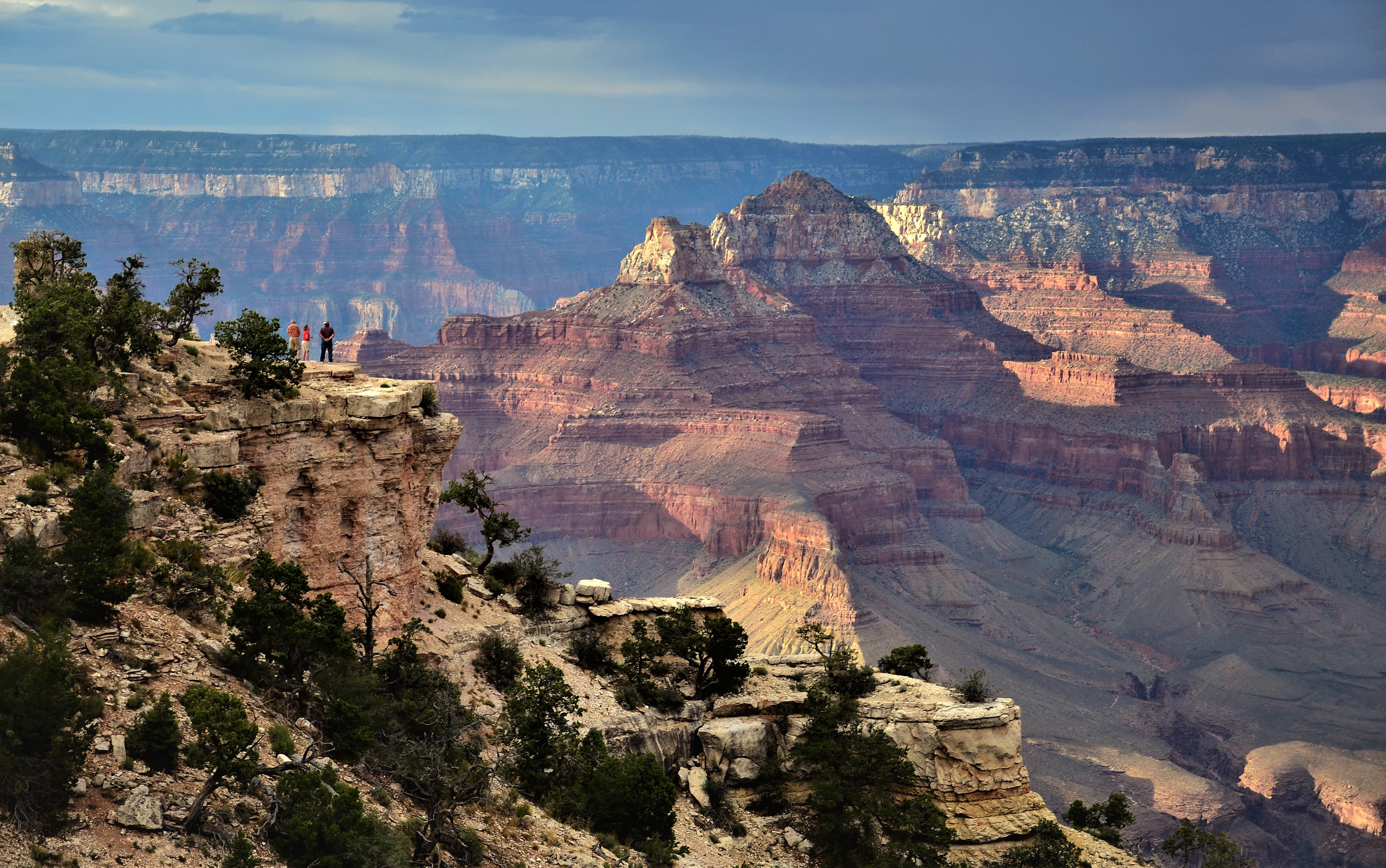
Brahma Temple seen from Shoshone Point on South Rim

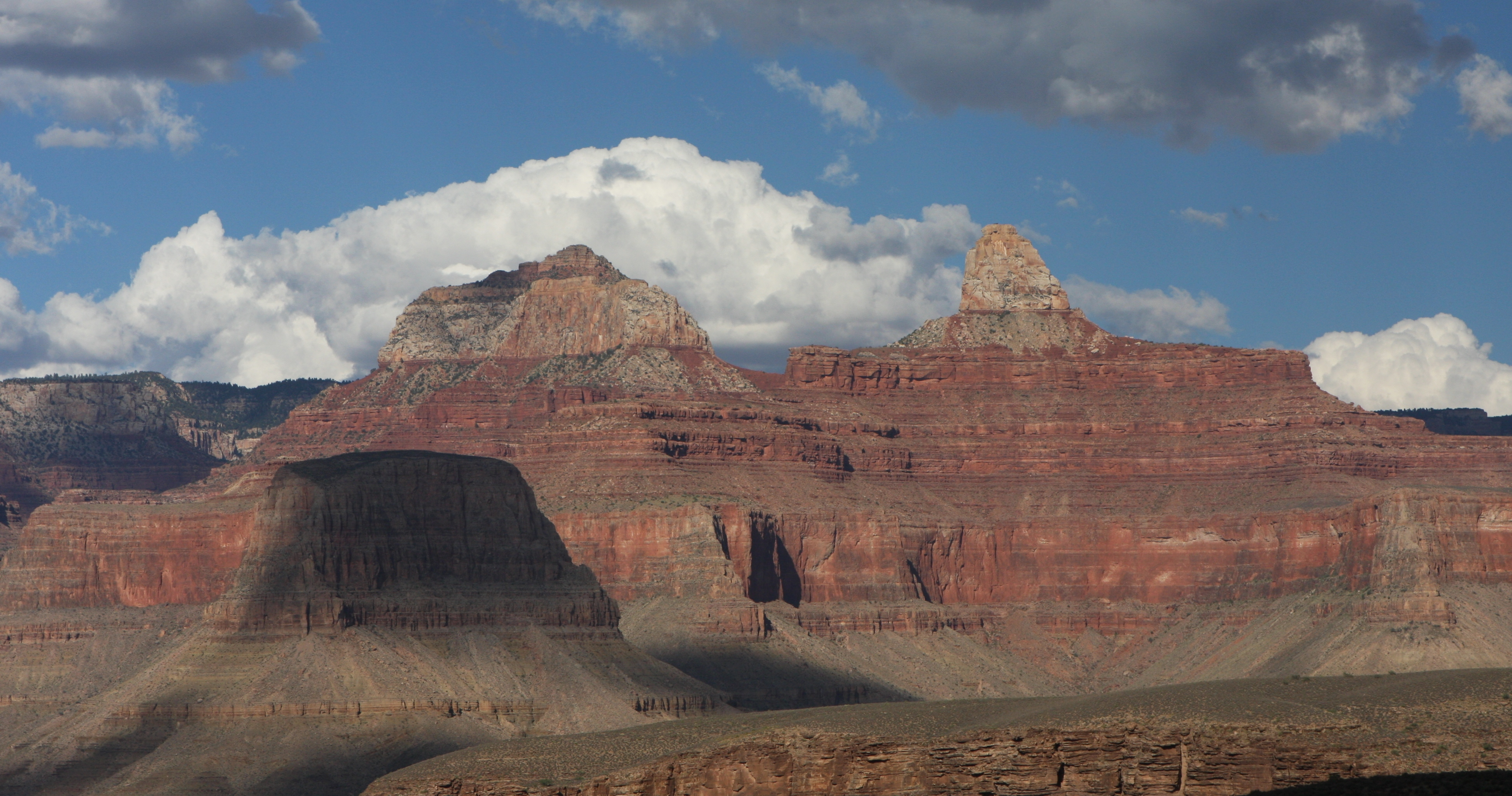
Brahma Temple (left) and Zoroaster Temple (right), from southwest
(Sumner Butte, shaded, in lower left)

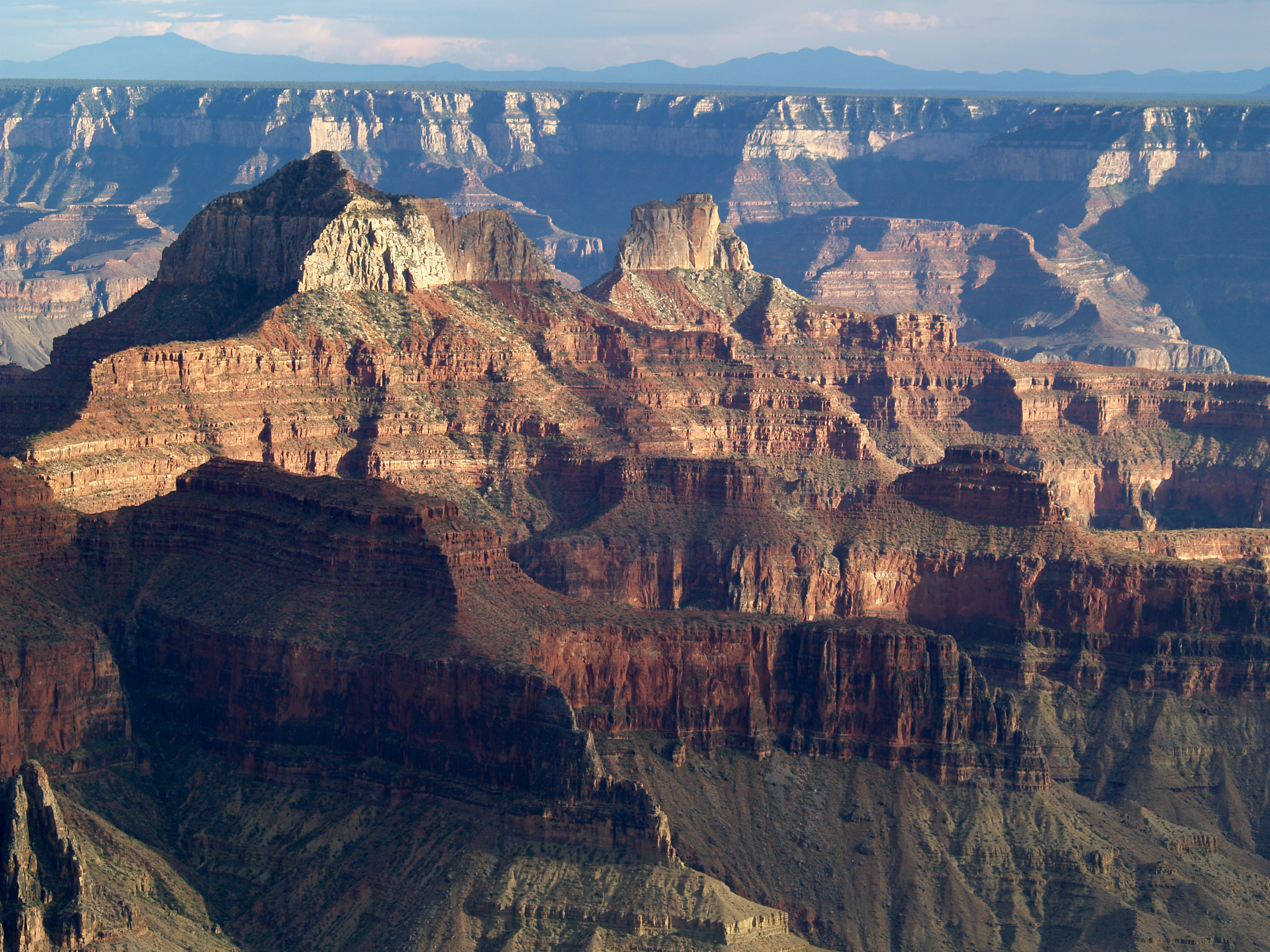
Brahma Temple (left) seen from North Rim at Bright Angel Point

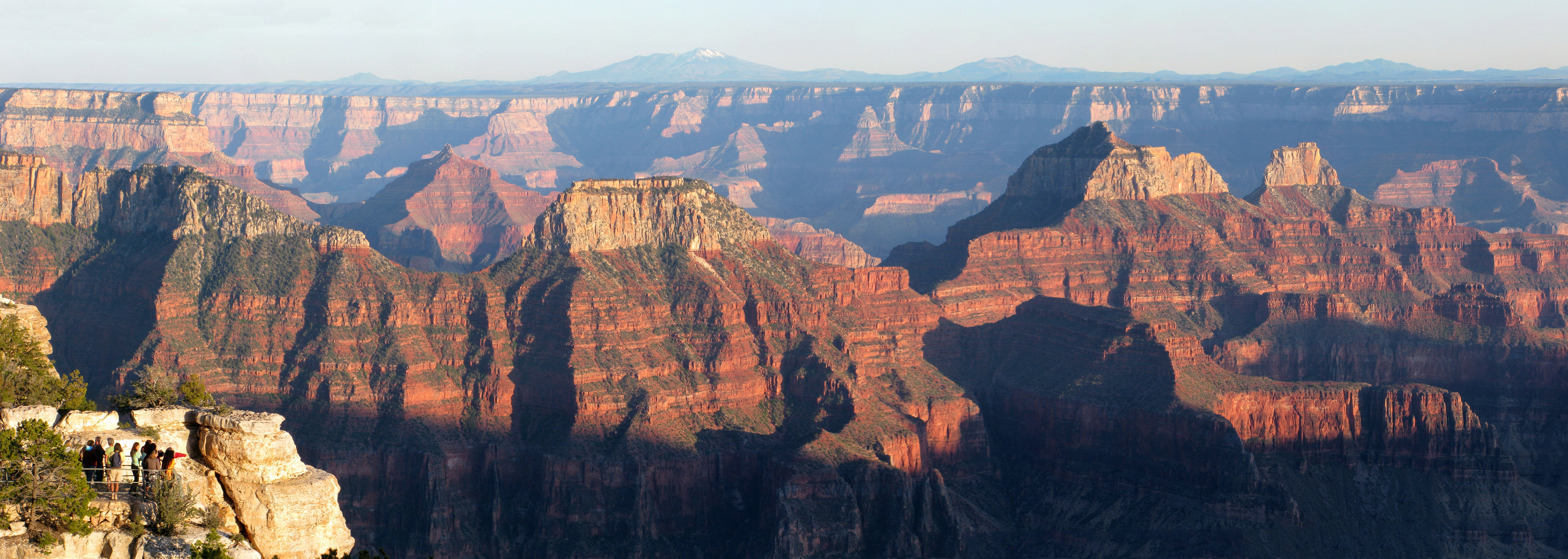
Brahma Temple (right) seen from North Rim at Bright Angel Point

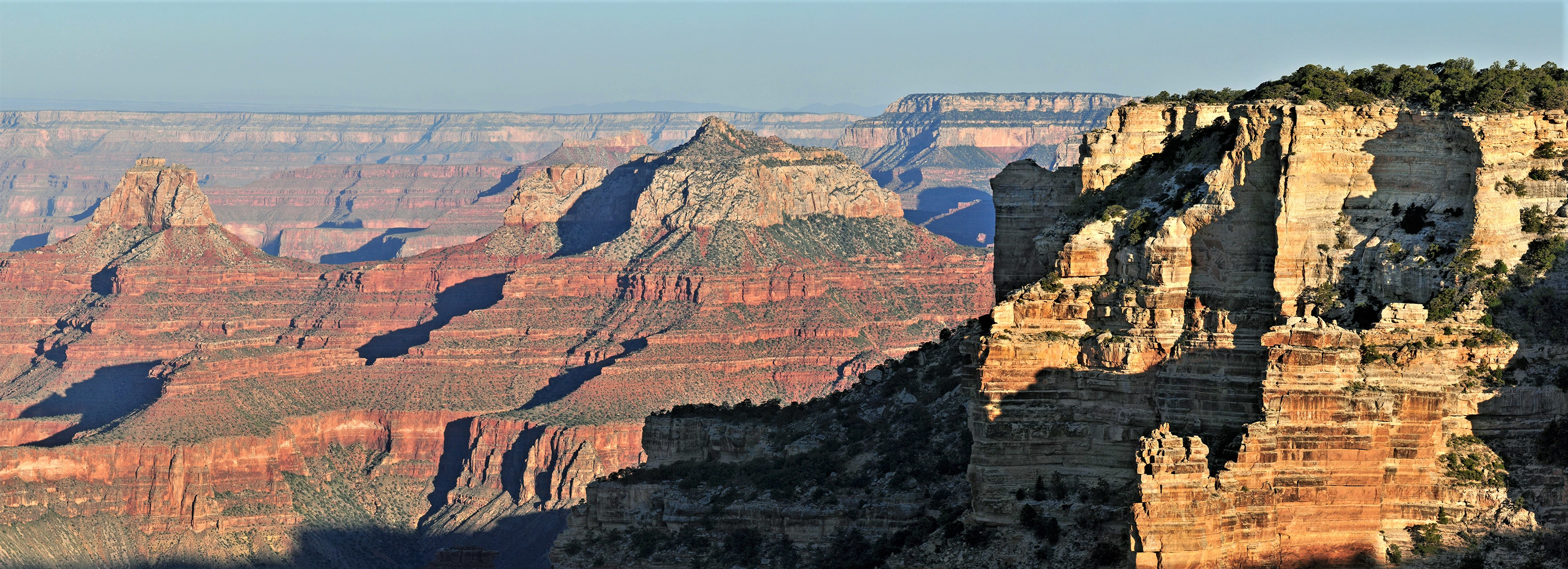
East aspect of Brahma (centered) seen from Cape Royal

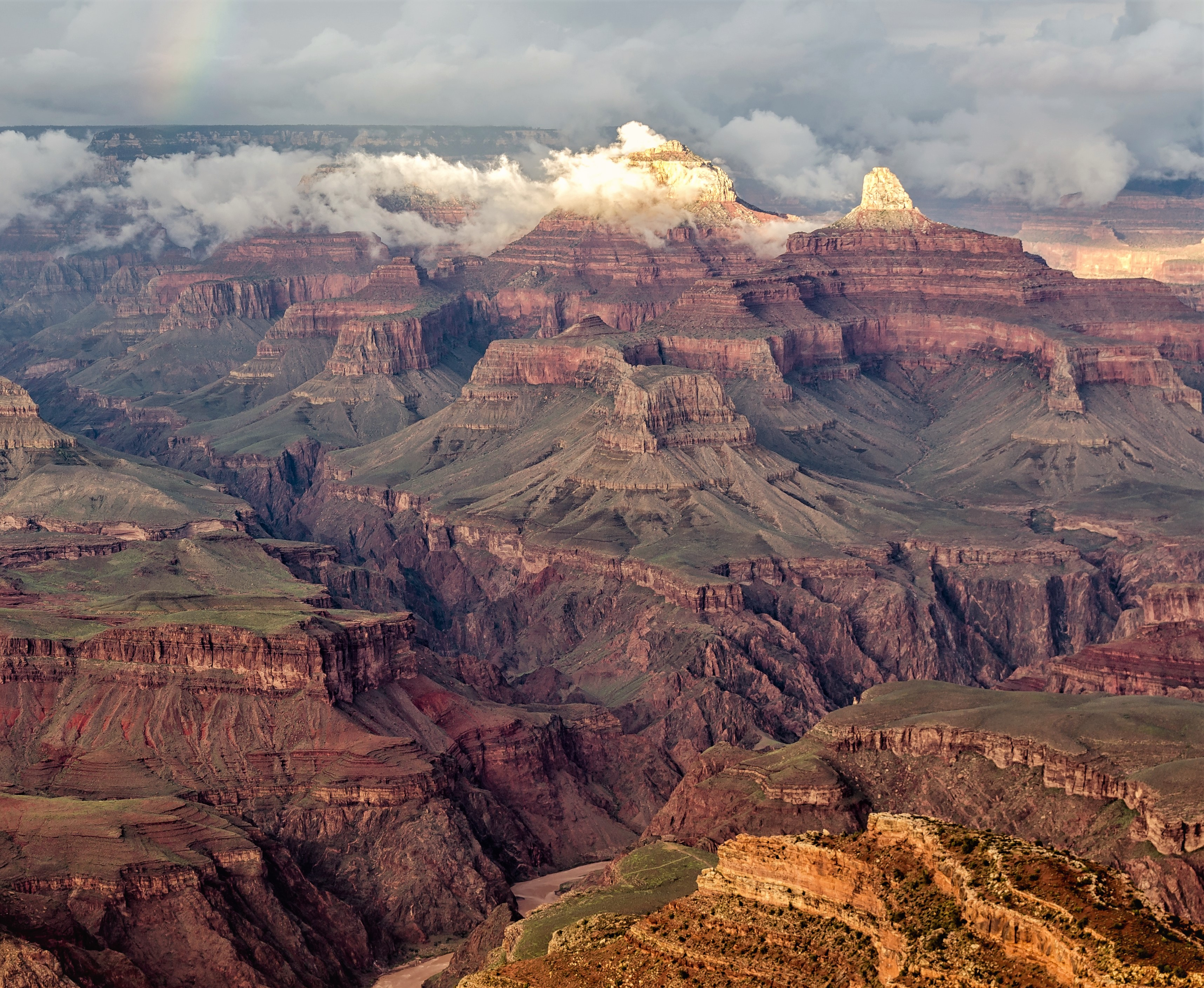
Brahma (centered), from Hopi Point on the South Rim

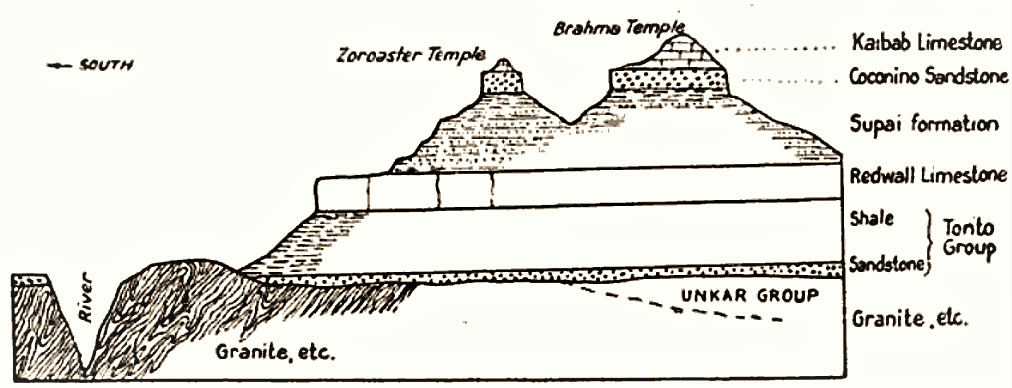

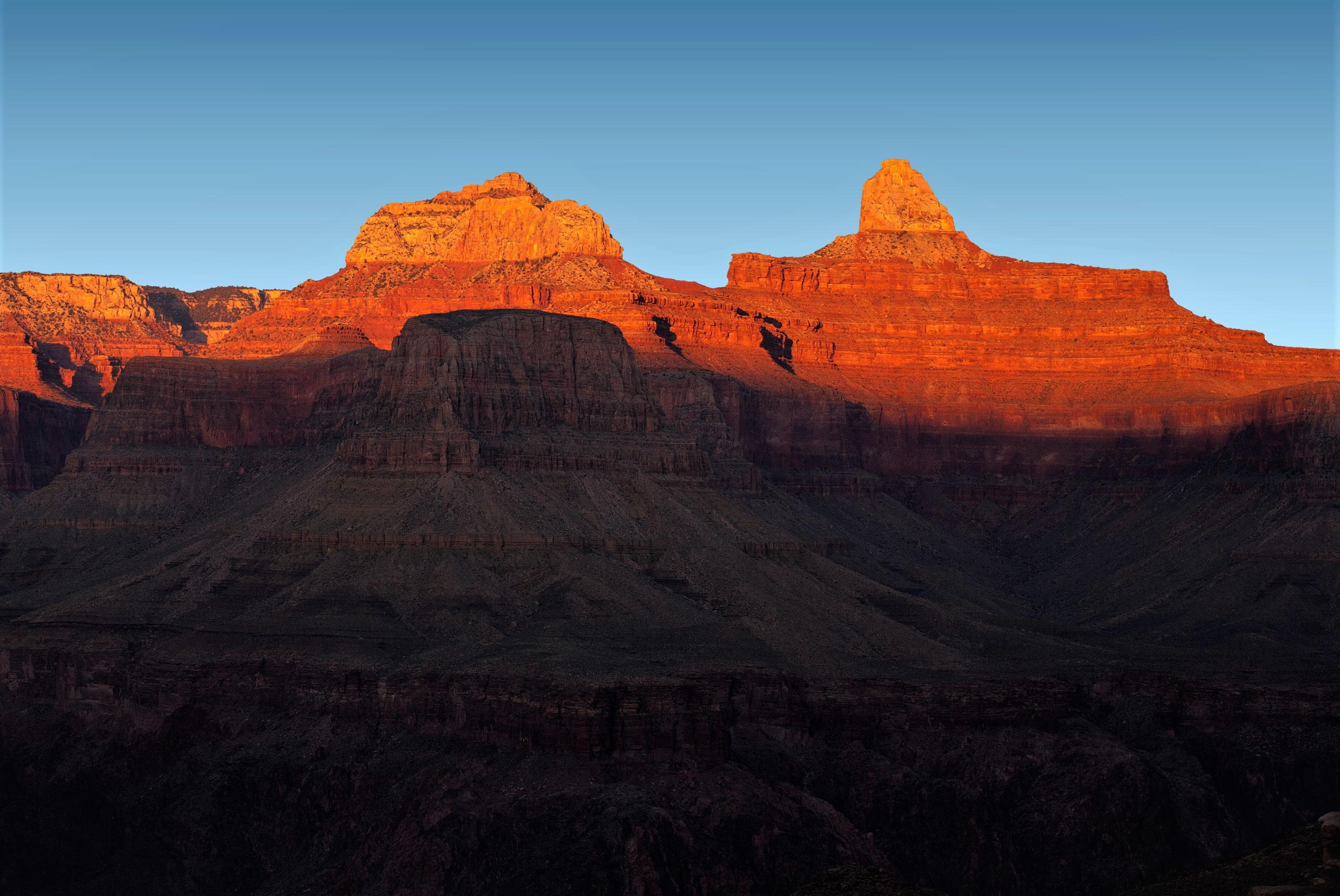
Sunset on Brahma Temple (left), Zoroaster Temple (right)

== See also ==
- Geology of the Grand Canyon area
