= Horus Temple =

Summit in the Grand Canyon, Arizona

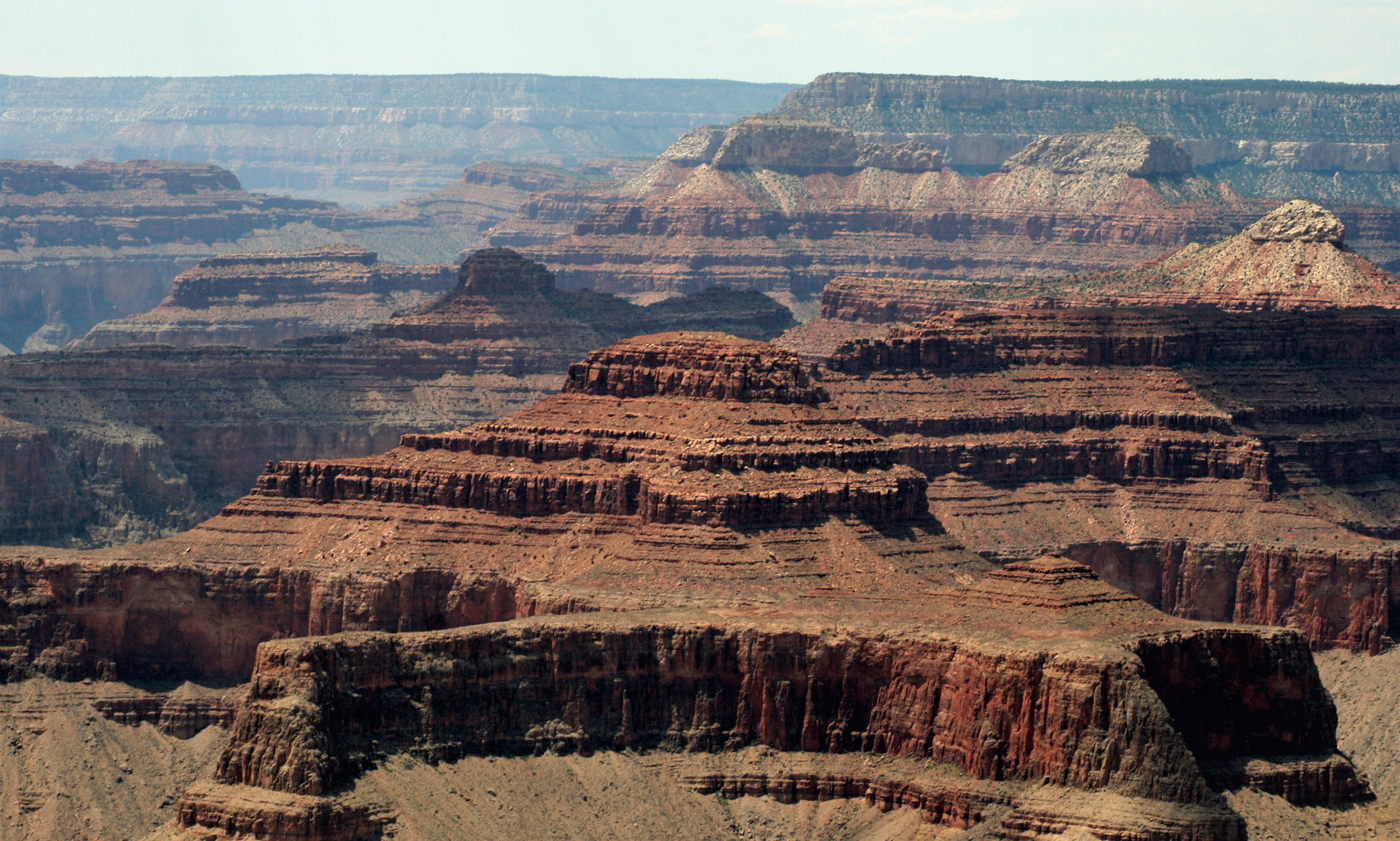
- Tower of Set prominence (center); Horus Temple prominence (upper right), with white-Coconino Sandstone capstone, on eroded slopes of Hermit Formation

Highest point
- Elevation: 6,150 ft (1,870 m)
- Prominence: 610 ft (190 m)
- Parent peak: Osiris Temple
- Isolation: 0.73 mi (1.17 km)
- Coordinates: 36°08′17″N 112°10′40″W

Naming
- Etymology: Horus

Geography
- Location within Arizona Location within the United States
- Location: Grand Canyon; Coconino County, Arizona, US
- Parent range: Kaibab Plateau; Colorado Plateau

Geology
- Mountain type(s): sedimentary units: sandstone, shale, siltstone, mudstone, limestone
- Rock types: (caprock-debris cliff)-Coconino Sandstone, on slopes of Hermit Formation (shale) debris, upon platform of resistant cliff-former Esplanade Sandstone and Coconino Sandstone-caprock, Hermit Formation, Esplanade Sandstone-platform-(Supai Group, unit 4 of 4), Supai Group, Redwall Limestone, Muav Limestone, Bright Angel Shale, Tapeats Sandstone

Horus Temple is a 6,150 ft elevation summit located in the Grand Canyon, in Coconino County of Arizona, Southwestern United States. This butte is situated as the central landform in a 3-series line of peaks southwest of the Shiva Temple (forested)-tableland prominence.

== Geology ==
The top of Horus Temple is a flat ~north-south platform composed of the reddish Pennsylvanian-Permian Supai Group. The 69th unit and uppermost unit of the Supai Group is the extremely resistant Esplanade Sandstone. At the north end of this platform is the butte's prominence, an extremely fractured remnant, of cliff-former Coconino Sandstone capstone, upon a small slope of slope-forming, deep brown-red Hermit Formation.

The Supai Group sits on the resistant cliff-forming, typically massive Redwall Limestone, (as in the connected Tower of Set southwards). The base of the Redwall has a short, but resistant cliff of (3rd-unit) Muav Limestone. Below the Muav are units 2 and 1 of the 3-unit Tonto Group, the colorful dull-greenish Bright Angel Shale, and dp-brown Tapeats Sandstone.

== Gallery ==
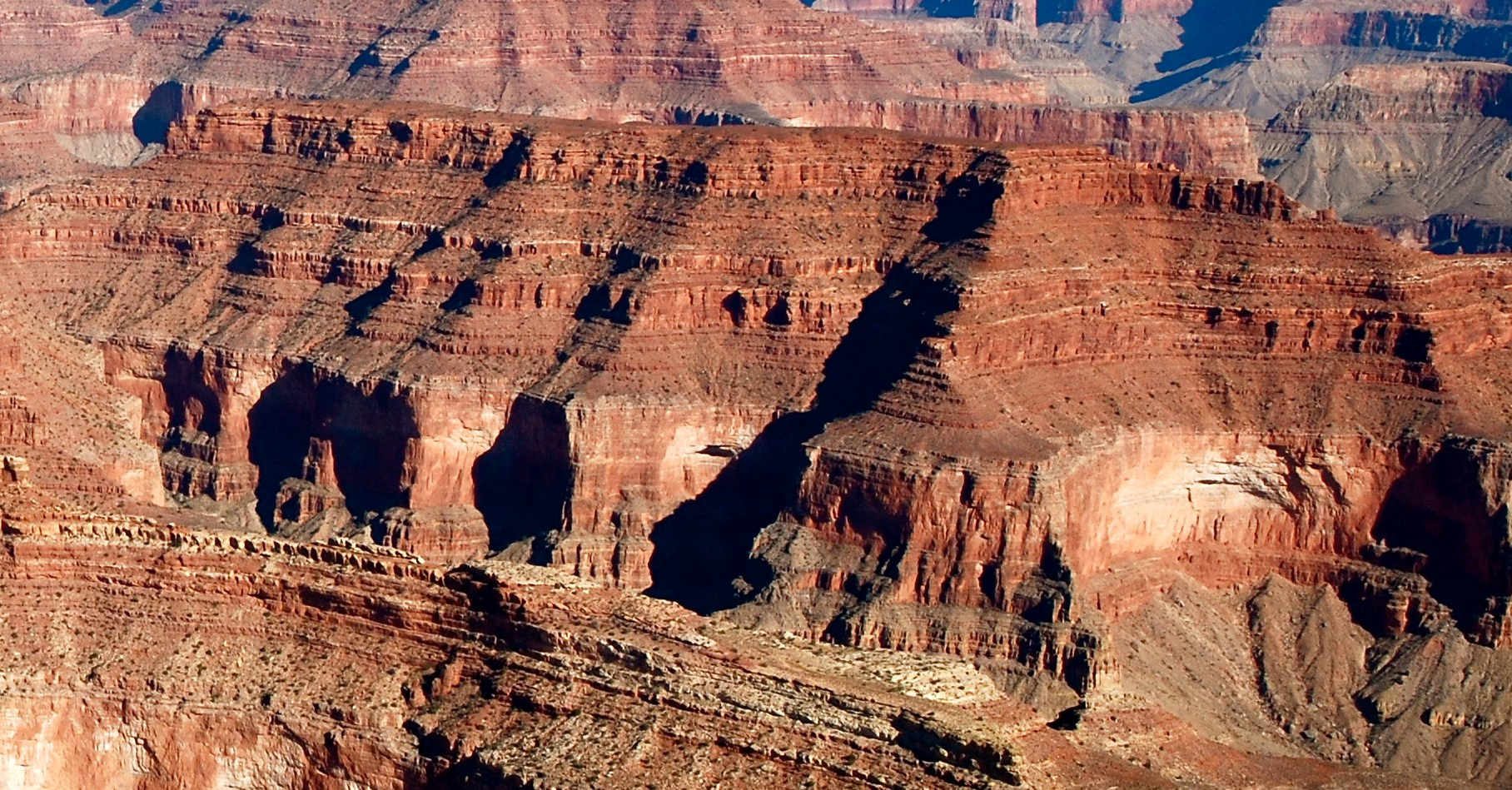
Horus Temple, aerial view from west

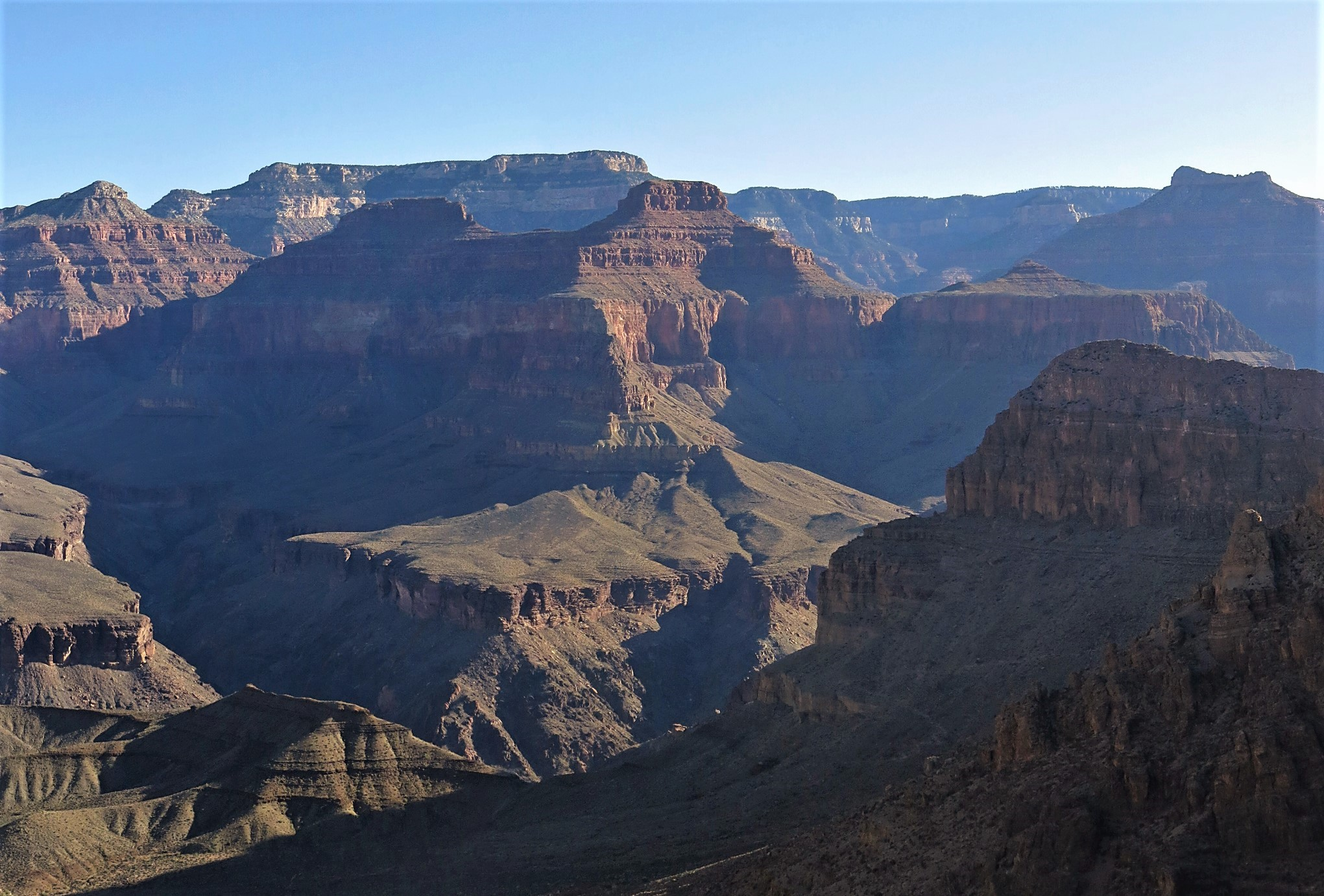
(Viewed from southeast)
Tower of Set peak-(center)
Horus Temple prominence-(extreme left)
Shiva Temple (Grand Canyon), forested tableland summit on the left horizon
(photo note: Tower of Set, has the 2 closer prominences)

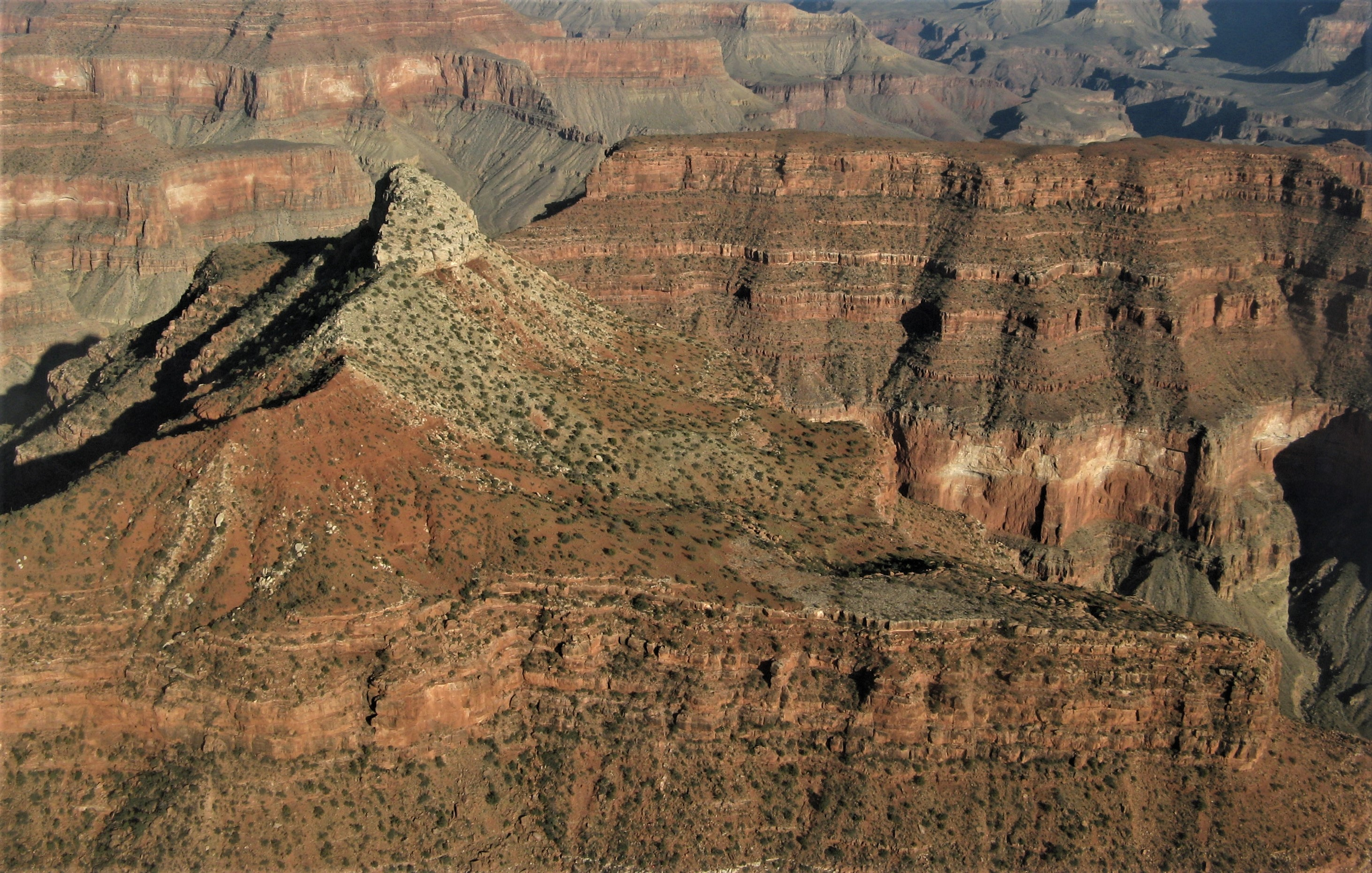
Osiris Temple left, and Horus Temple right. Aerial view from west.
