= Tower of Ra =

Landform in the Grand Canyon, Arizona

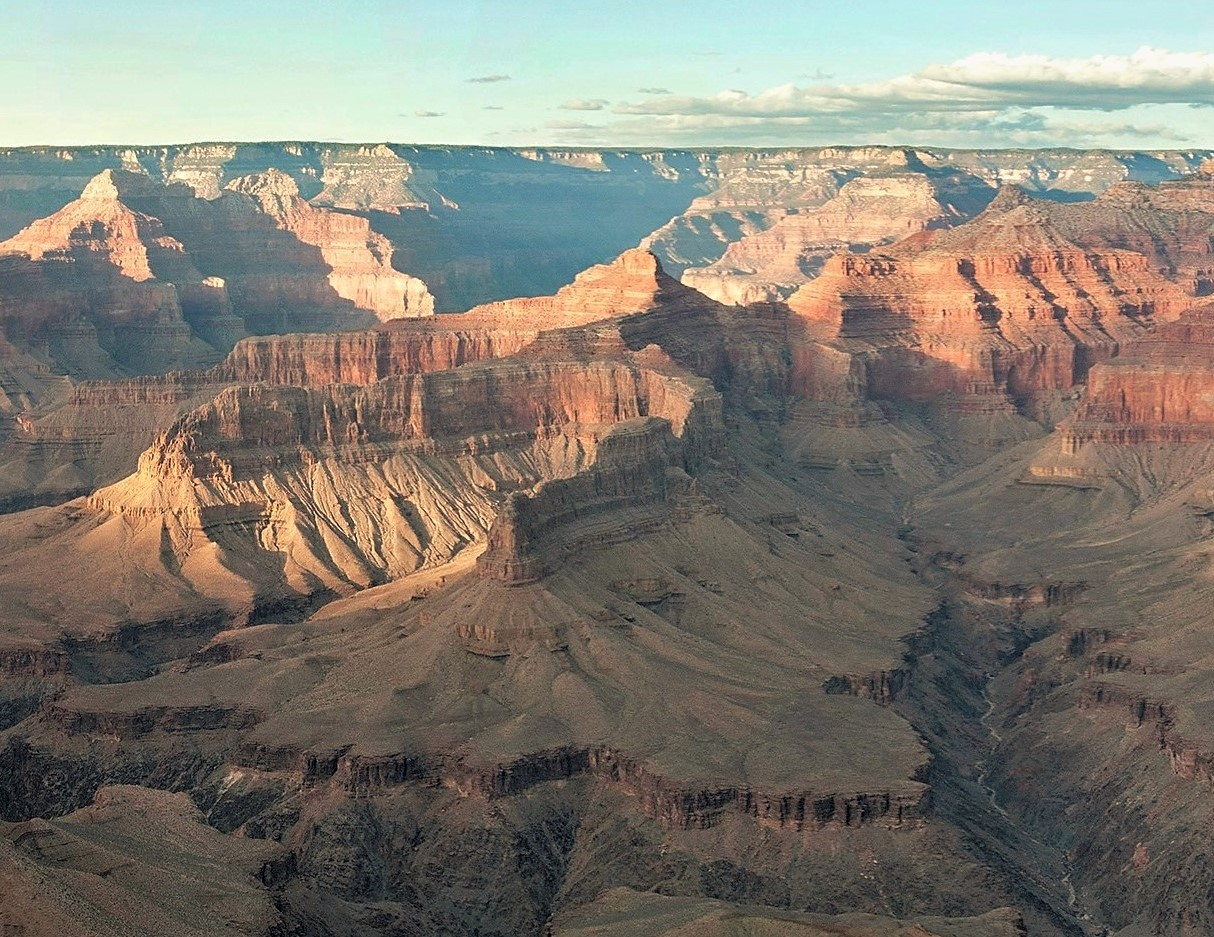
- South aspect, from Hermits Rest on South Rim

Highest point
- Elevation: 6,129 ft (1,868 m)
- Prominence: 709 ft (216 m)
- Parent peak: Osiris Temple (6,613 ft)
- Isolation: 0.97 mi (1.56 km)
- Coordinates: 36°08′27″N 112°12′14″W

Geography
- Location within Arizona Location within the United States
- Country: United States
- State: Arizona
- County: Coconino
- Protected area: Grand Canyon National Park
- Parent range: Kaibab Plateau; Colorado Plateau
- Topo map: USGS Shiva Temple

Geology
- Rock type(s): sandstone, siltstone, mudstone

Climbing
- First ascent: 1977
- Easiest route: class 5.1 climbing

Tower of Ra is a 6,129-foot-elevation (1,868-meter) pillar located in the Grand Canyon, in Coconino County of Arizona, US. Its summit is situated five miles north of Pima Point overlook on the canyon's South Rim, three miles southeast of Confucius Temple, and two miles northwest of Tower of Set, where it towers over 3,700 feet (1,100 meters) above the Colorado River. Tower of Ra was named in 1879 by Thomas Moran, for Ra, the Egyptian deity of the sun. This followed the naming convention of Clarence Dutton who began the tradition of naming geographical features in the Grand Canyon after mythological deities. This mountain's name was officially adopted in 1906 by the U.S. Board on Geographic Names. The first ascent was made in 1977 by Jim Haggart, Art Christiansen, and Barbara Zinn. According to the Köppen climate classification system, Tower of Ra is located in a cold semi-arid climate zone.

== Geology ==
The top of Tower of Ra is composed of the reddish Pennsylvanian-Permian Supai Group. Further down are strata of Mississippian Redwall Limestone, the Cambrian Tonto Group, and finally granite of the Paleoproterozoic Vishnu Basement Rocks at river level. Precipitation runoff from Tower of Ra drains south to the Colorado River via Crystal and Ninetyfour Mile Creeks.

== Gallery ==
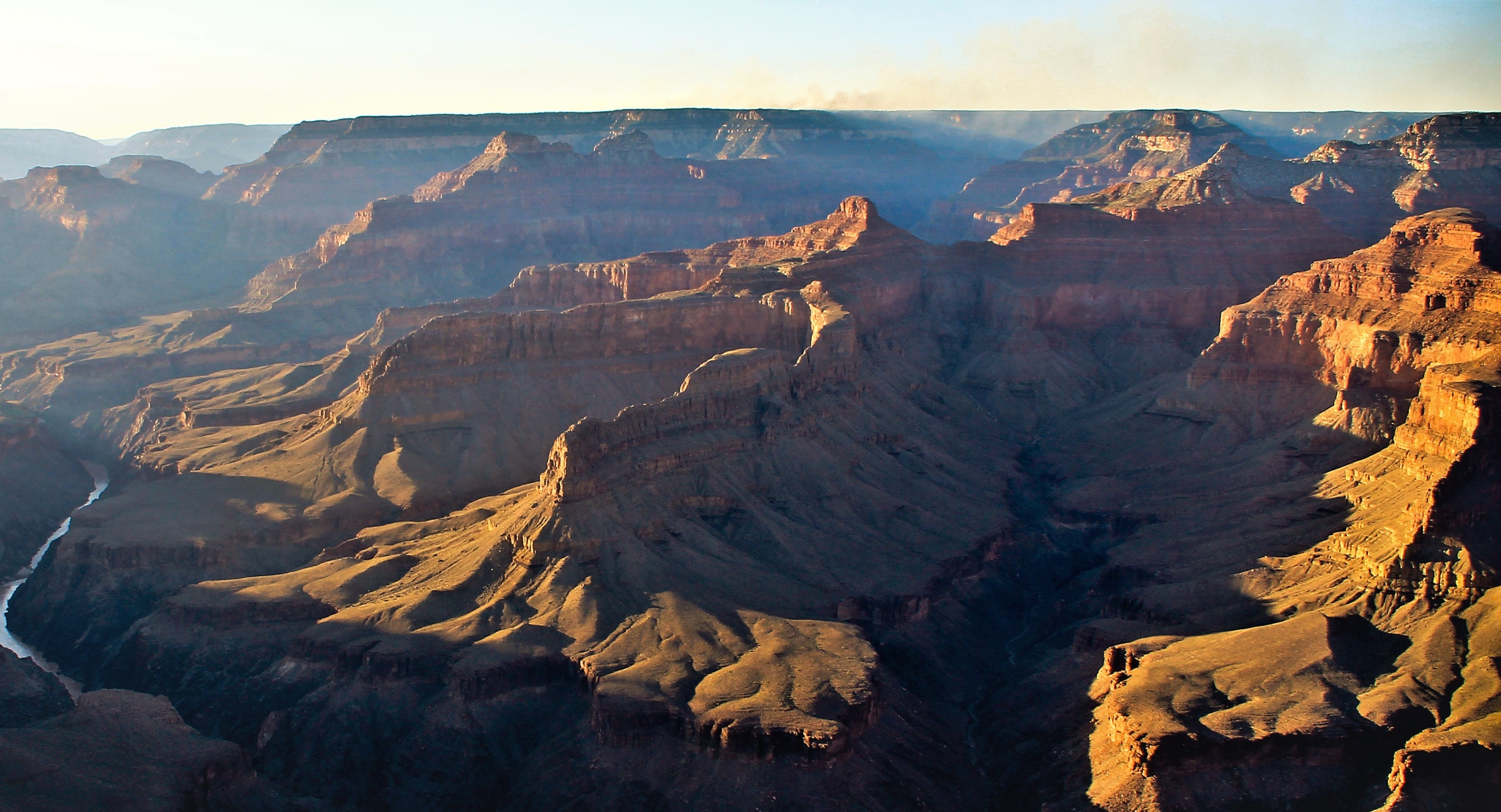
Tower of Ra sunset

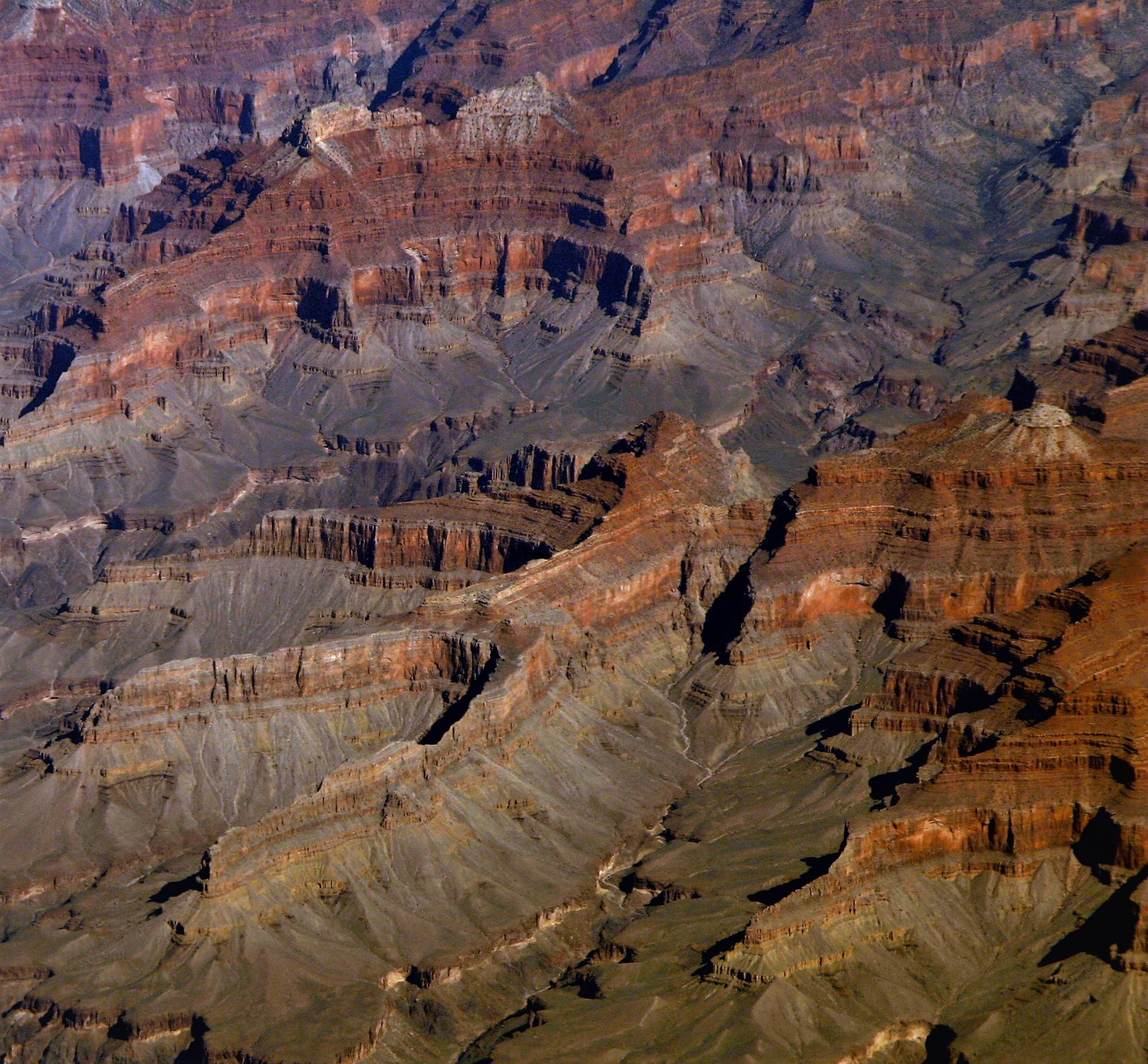
Aerial view with Tower of Ra centered. Mencius and Confucius Temples top, Osiris Temple right

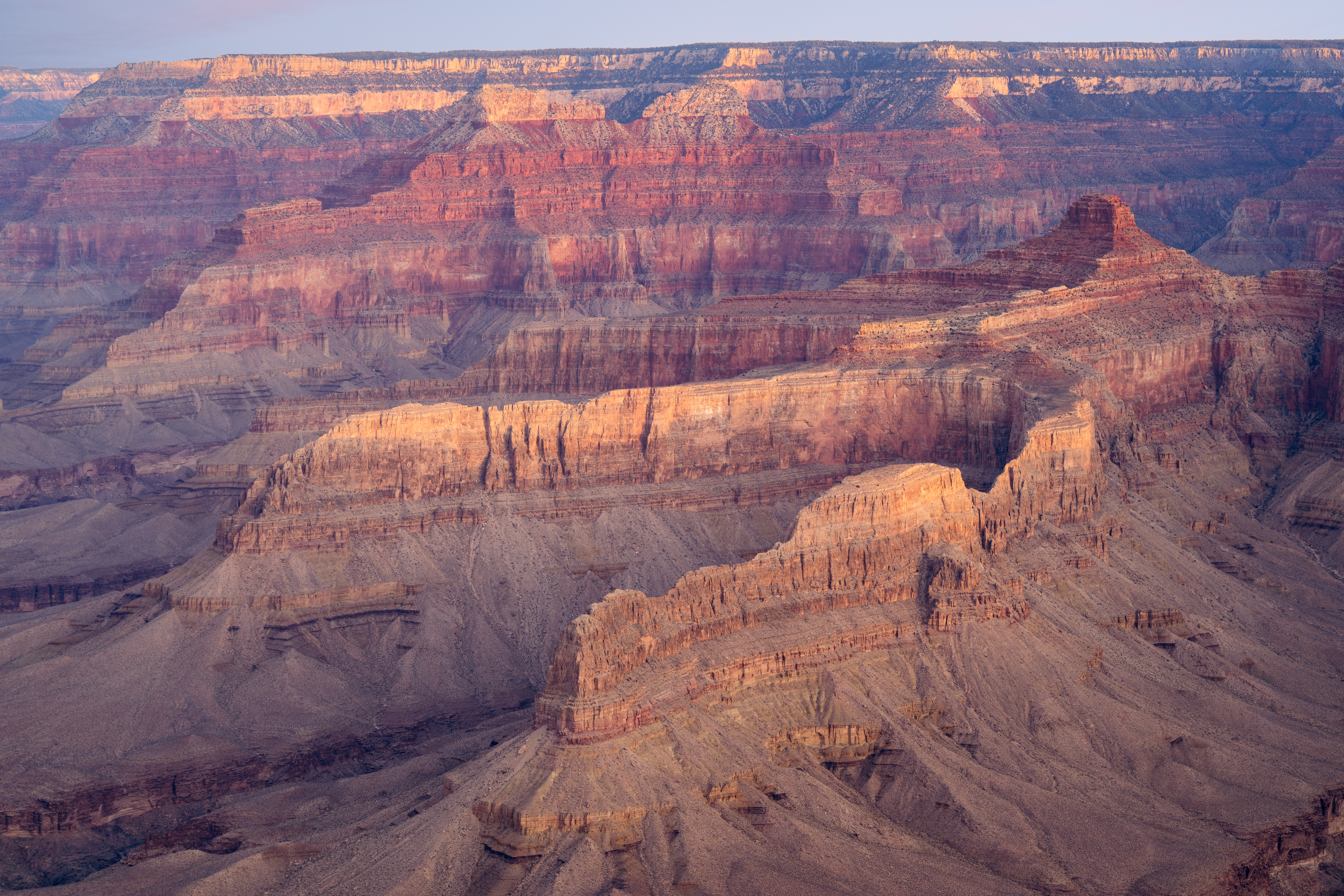
Tower of Ra to right

== See also ==
- Geology of the Grand Canyon area
