= Tower of Set =

Landform in the Grand Canyon, Arizona

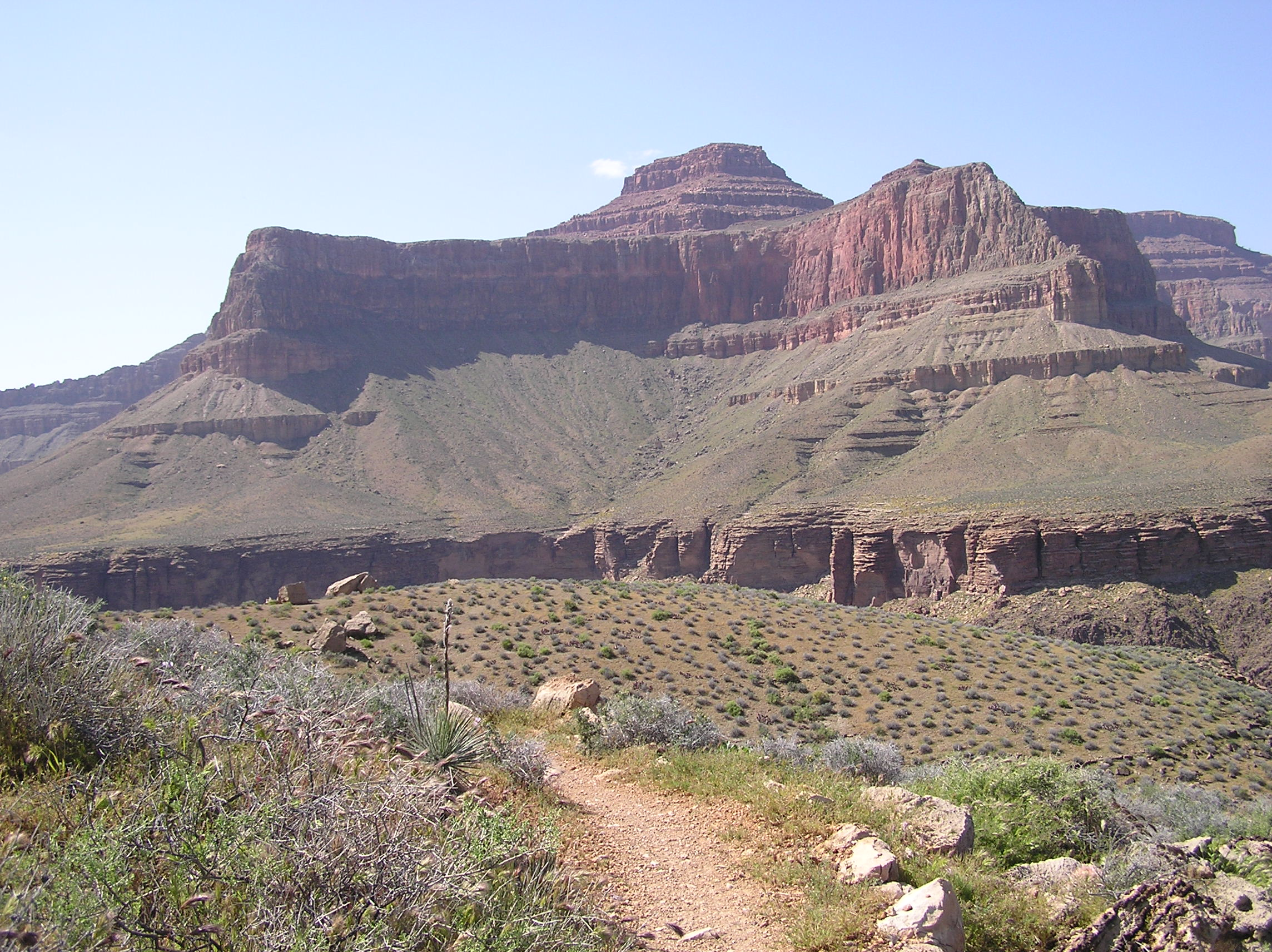
- Southeast aspect, from Tonto Trail

Highest point
- Elevation: 6,012 ft (1,832 m)
- Prominence: 432 ft (132 m)
- Parent peak: Horus Temple (6,150 ft)
- Isolation: 1.16 mi (1.87 km)
- Coordinates: 36°07′16″N 112°10′41″W

Geography
- Location within Arizona Location within the United States
- Country: United States
- State: Arizona
- County: Coconino
- Protected area: Grand Canyon National Park
- Parent range: Kaibab Plateau; Colorado Plateau
- Topo map: USGS Grand Canyon

Geology
- Rock type(s): sandstone, siltstone, mudstone

Climbing
- First ascent: 1977
- Easiest route: class 5.1 climbing

Tower of Set is a 6,012-foot-elevation (1,832-meter) summit located in the Grand Canyon, in Coconino County of Arizona, US. This butte is situated four miles north of Hopi Point overlook on the canyon's South Rim, two miles southeast of Tower of Ra, and three miles south-southwest of Shiva Temple, where it towers 3,600 feet (1,100 meters) above the Colorado River. Tower of Set was originally named Temple of Sett in 1879 by Thomas Moran, for the Egyptian deity of war, Set, because a niche worn into its wall evoked temples in the valley of the Nile. Another source states it was named by George Wharton James, in keeping with Clarence Dutton's tradition of naming geographical features in the Grand Canyon after mythological deities. This mountain's name was officially adopted in 1906 by the U.S. Board on Geographic Names. In 1919, Harriet Williams Russell Strong proposed connecting Hopi Point and Tower of Set across the river via an aerial tramway, an idea that never came to fruition. The first ascent was made in November 1977 by Bruce Grubbs and Jim Haggart. According to the Köppen climate classification system, Tower of Set is located in a cold semi-arid climate zone.

== Geology ==
The top of Tower of Set is composed of the reddish Pennsylvanian-Permian Supai Group. Further down are strata of Mississippian Redwall Limestone, the Cambrian Tonto Group, and finally granite of the Paleoproterozoic Vishnu Basement Rocks at river level. Precipitation runoff from Tower of Set drains due-south to the Colorado River via Trinity Creek (east), and Ninetyfour Mile Creek (west).

== See also ==
- Geology of the Grand Canyon area

== Gallery ==
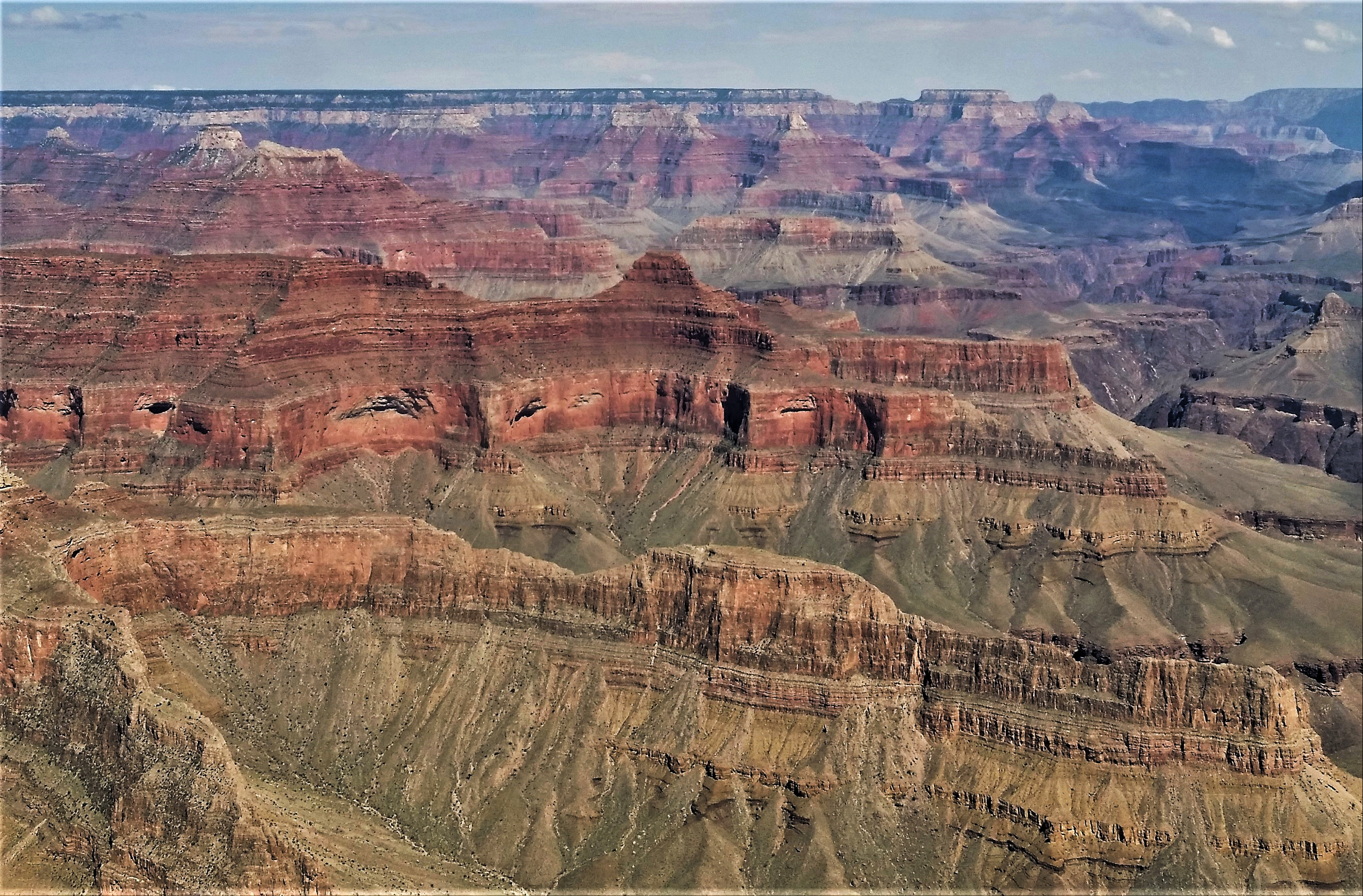
Tower of Set centered. Aerial view from the west.

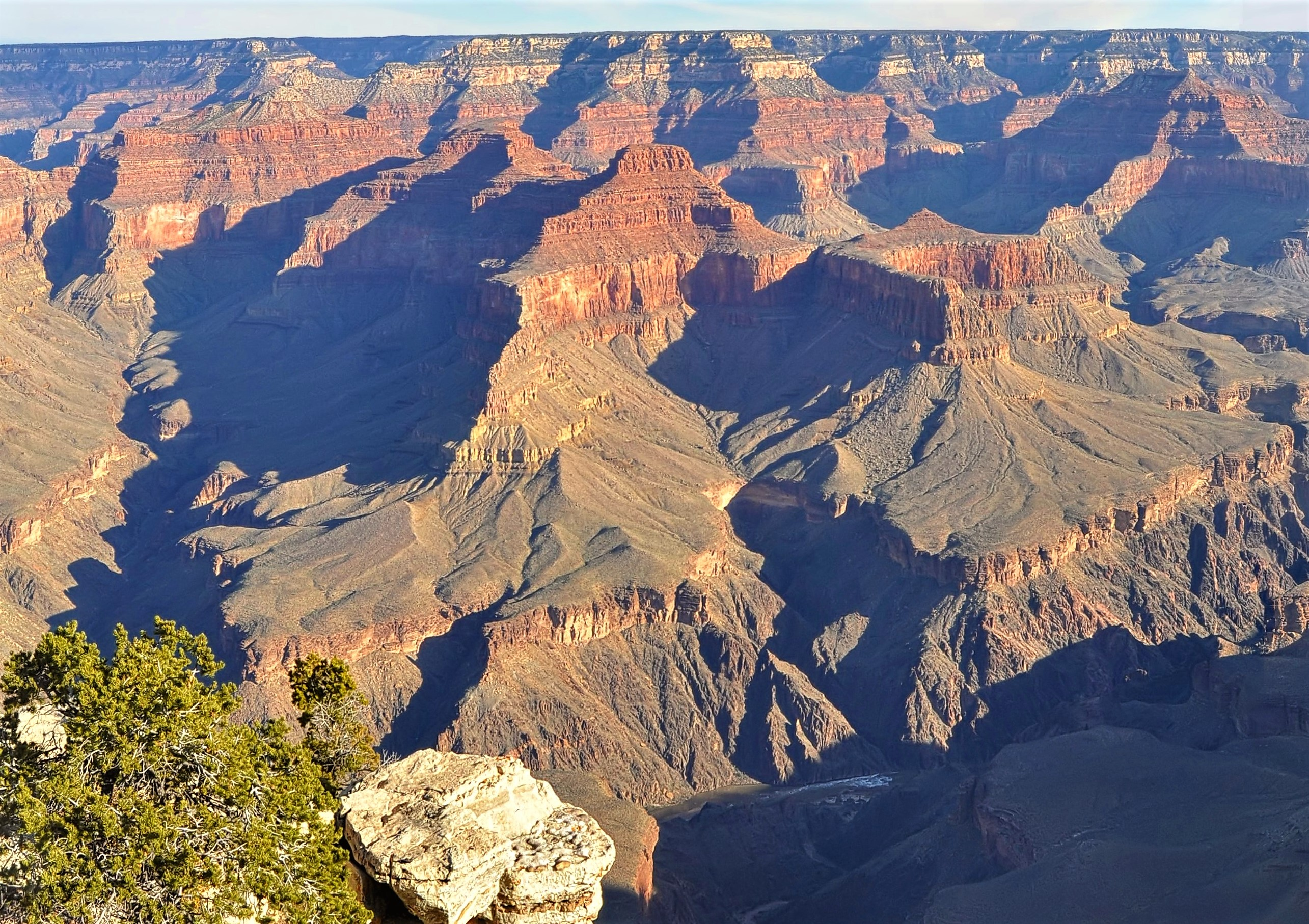
Tower of Set centered, seen from South Rim

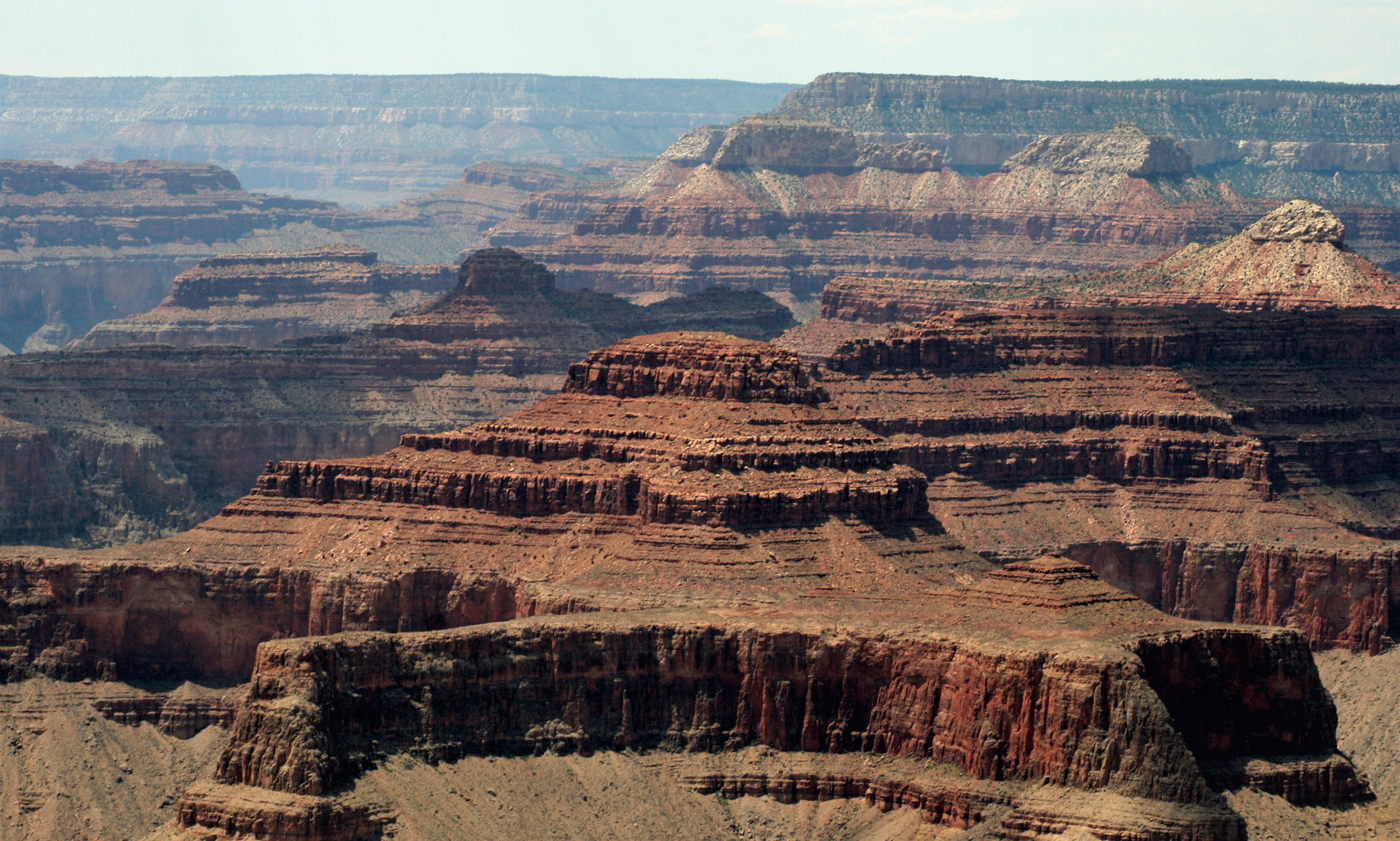

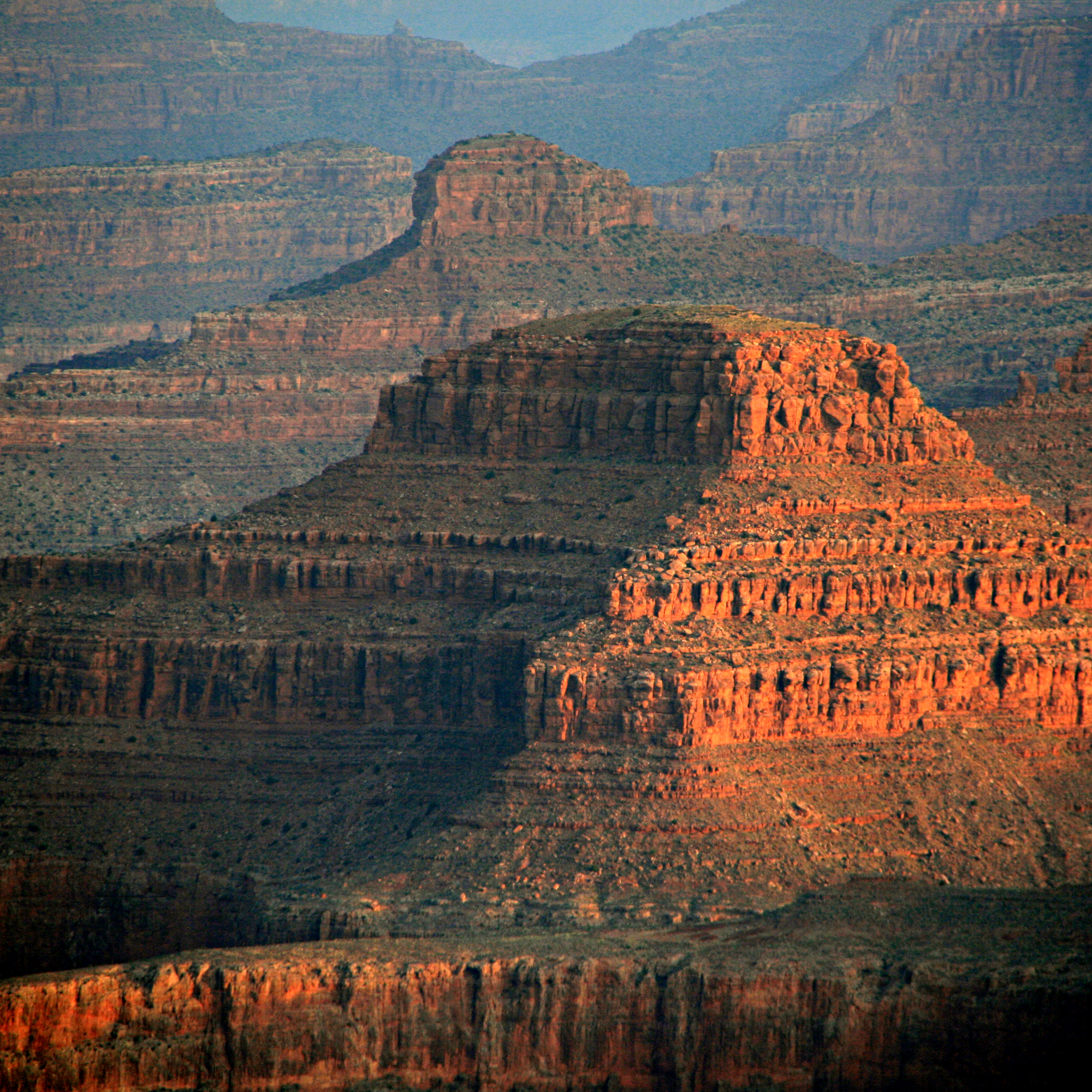
Tower of Set with Tower of Ra beyond

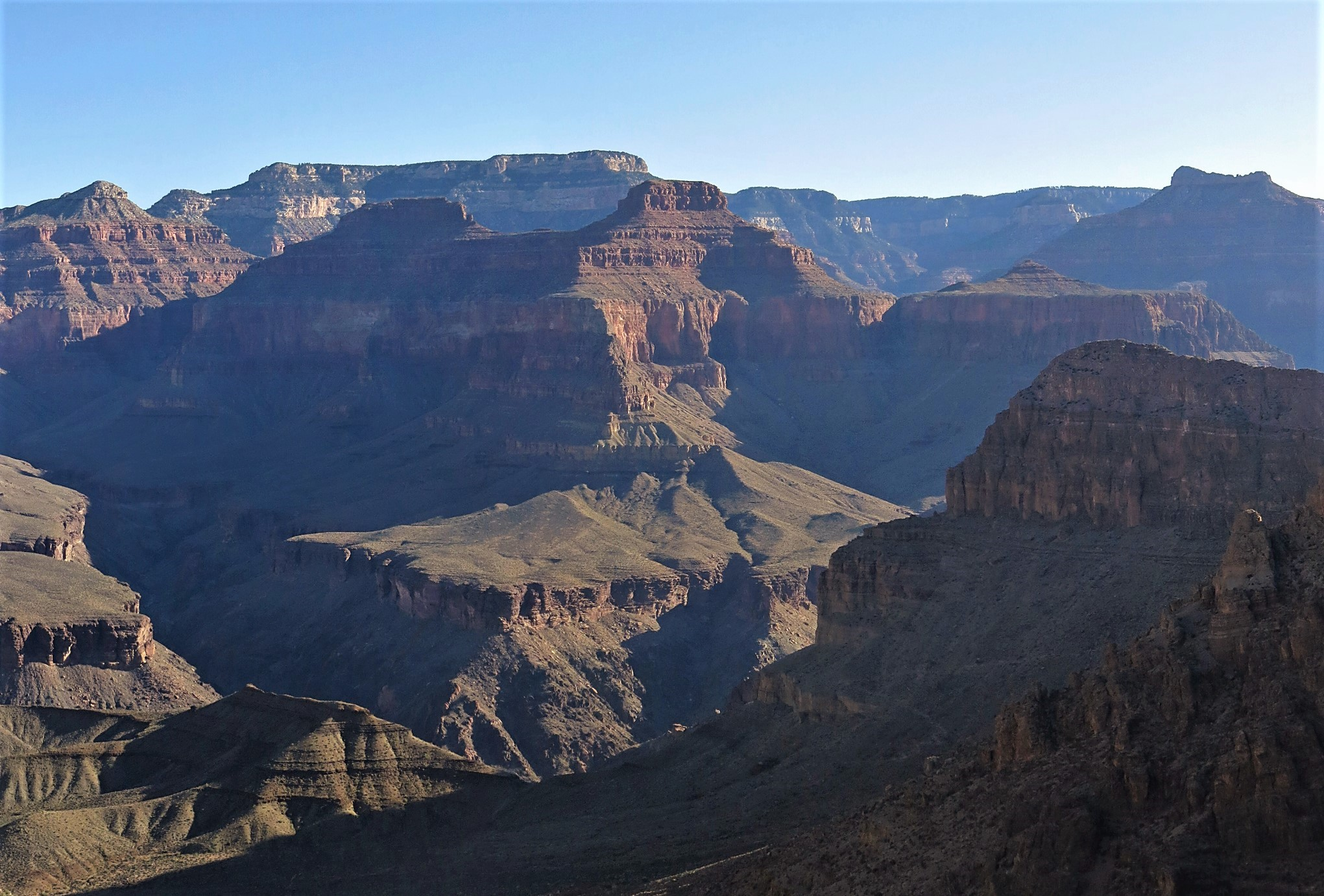
Tower of Set centered, Shiva Temple behind left

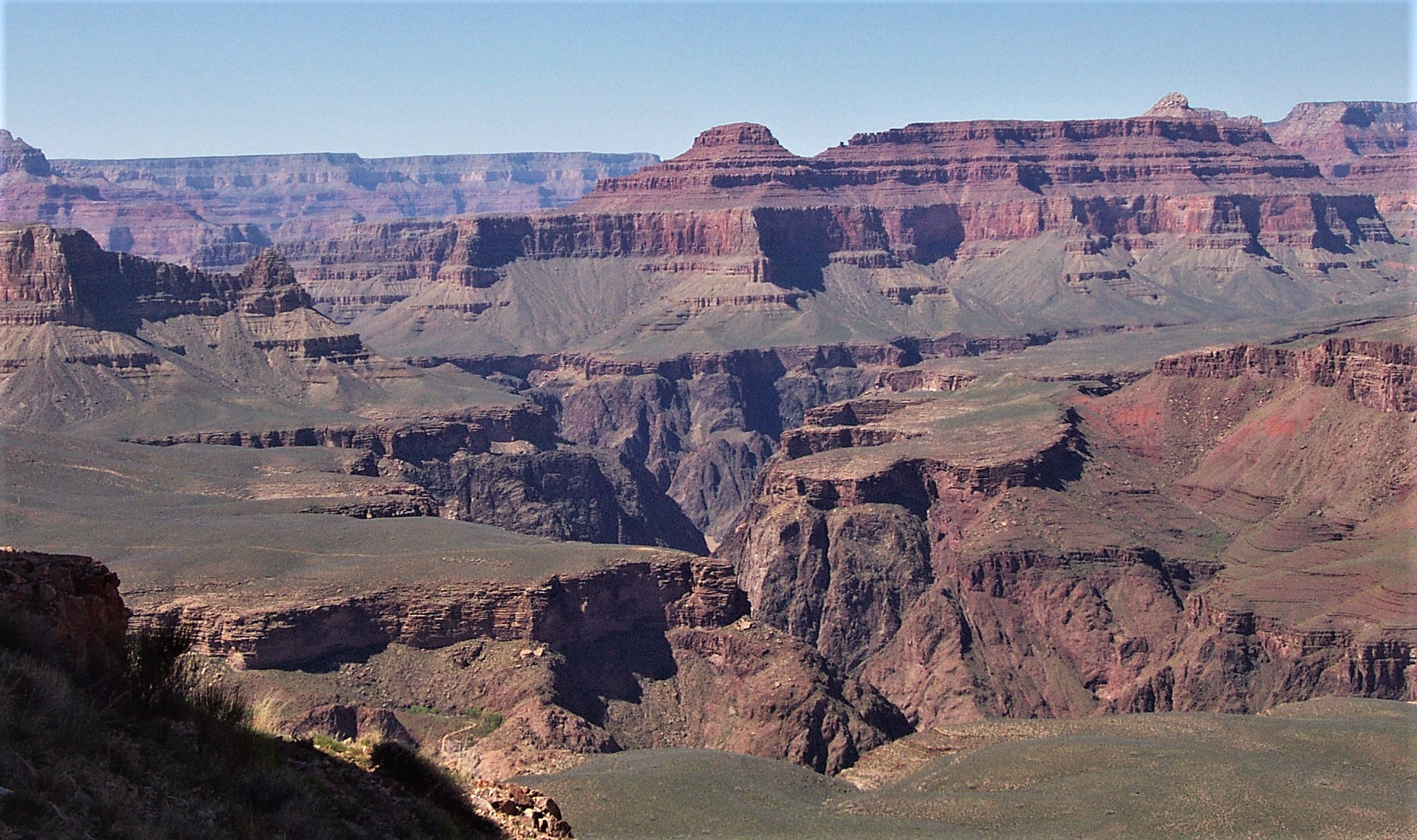
Tower of Set (centered) from east-southeast, with parent Horus Temple to right and Granite Gorge below

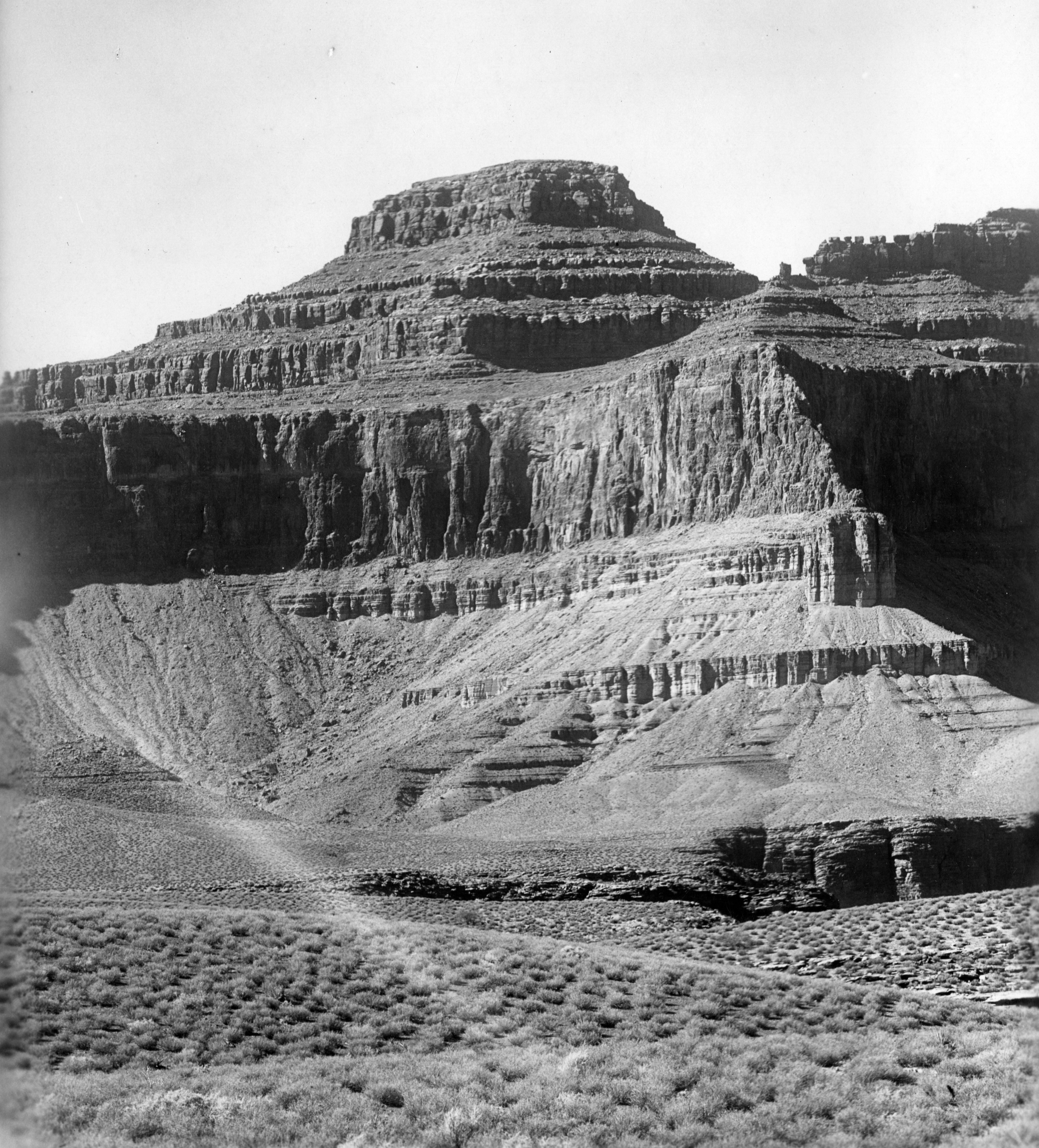
Tower of Set circa 1901

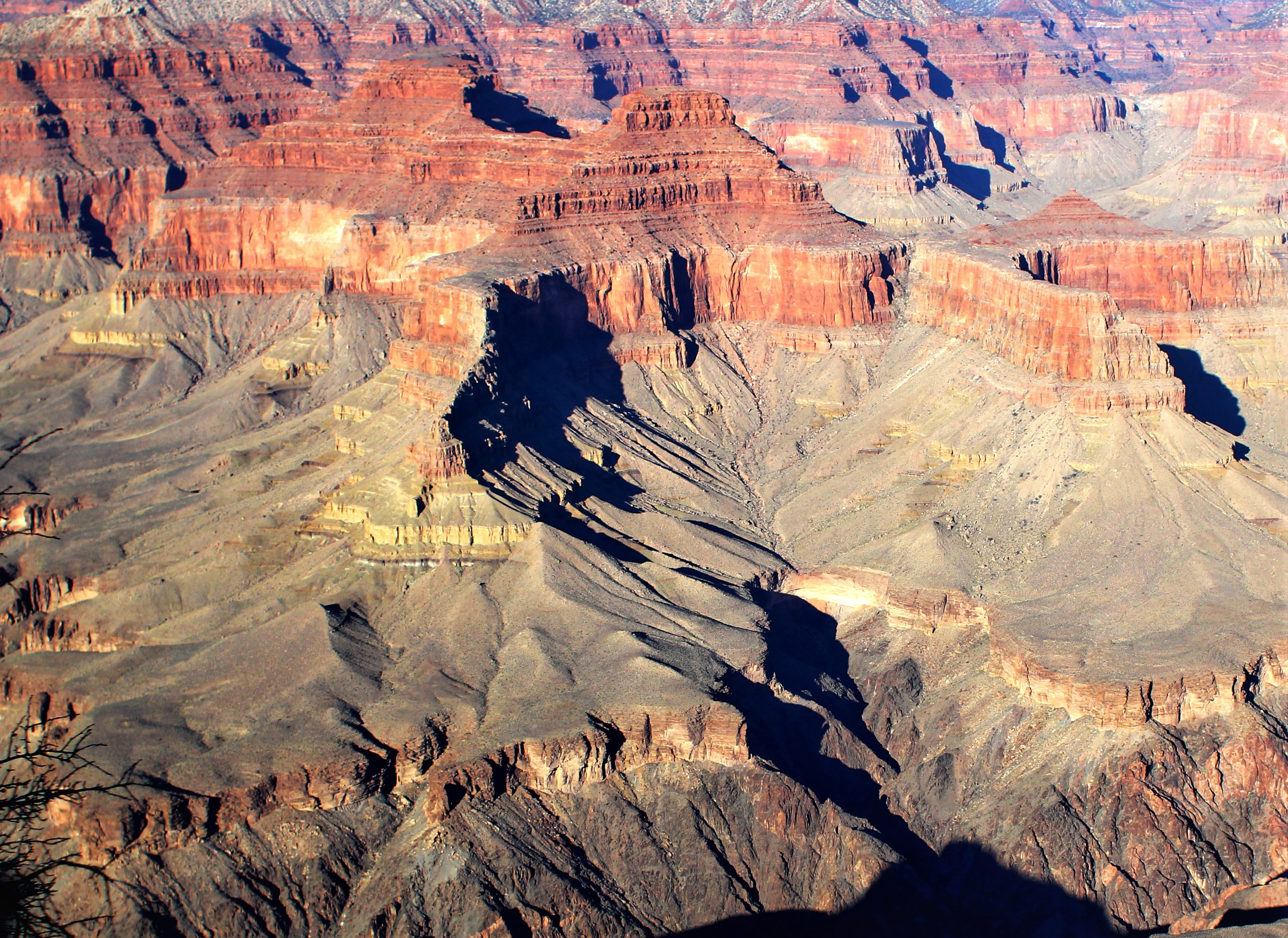
