= Osiris Temple =

Landform in the Grand Canyon, Arizona

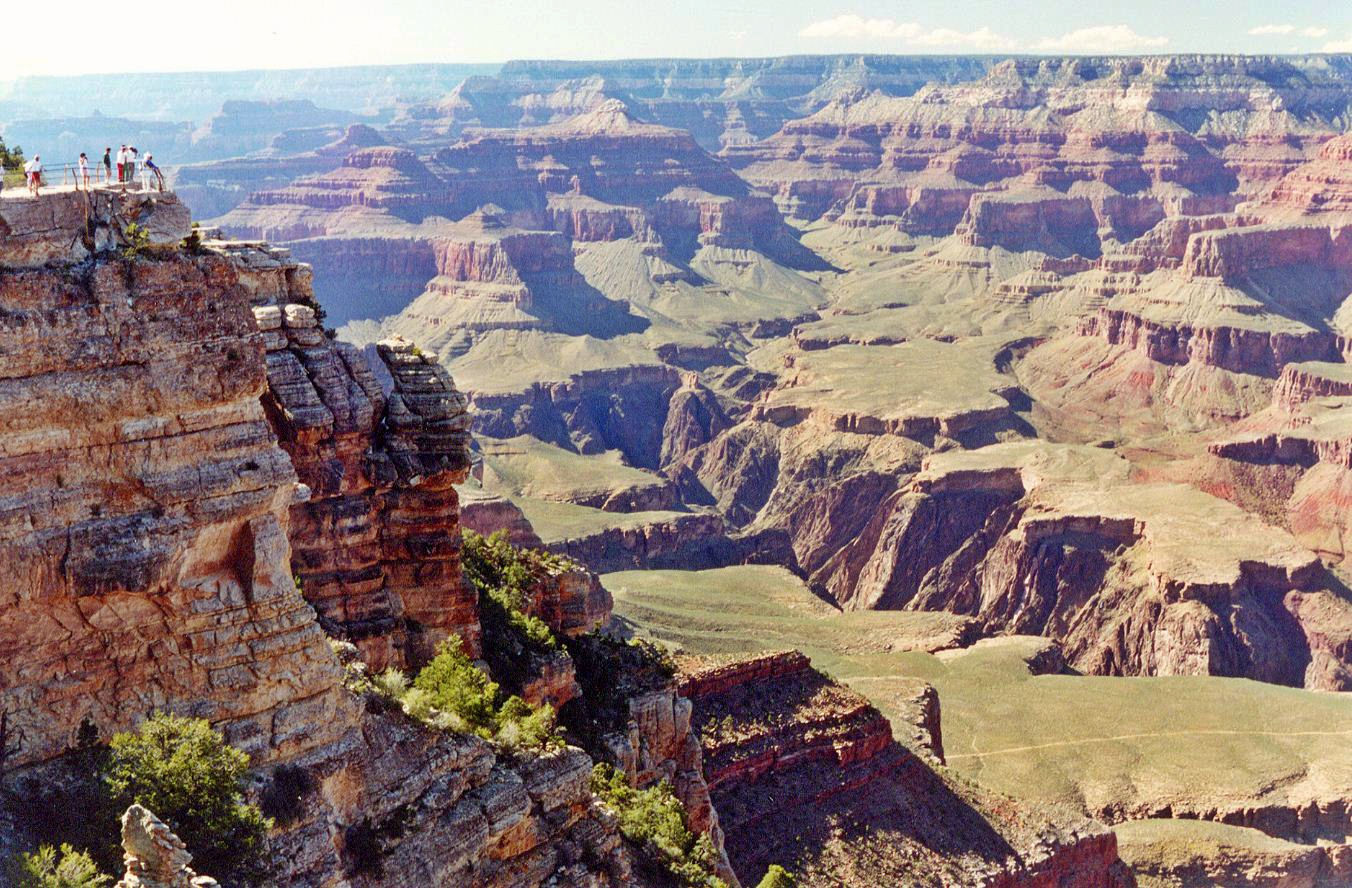
- (view north up Trinity Canyon) (west)-Three prominences: Tower of Set, Horus Temple, Osiris Temple (east)-Isis Temple (north)-Shiva Temple, (south flank)

Highest point
- Elevation: 6,613 ft (2,016 m)
- Prominence: 1,469 ft (448 m)
- Parent peak: Shiva Temple (Grand Canyon)
- Isolation: 2.27 mi (3.65 km)
- Coordinates: 36.1454°N 112.1871°W

Naming
- Etymology: Osiris

Geography
- Location within Arizona Location within the United States
- Location: Grand Canyon; Coconino County, Arizona, US
- Parent range: Kaibab Plateau; Colorado Plateau

Geology
- Rock type(s): sandstone, siltstone, mudstone

Osiris Temple is a 6,613 ft elevation summit located in the Grand Canyon, in Coconino County of Arizona, US. This butte is situated approximately (2.27 mi) southwest of Shiva Temple, in the Upper Trinity Creek watershed, a north watershed into the Colorado River at Granite Gorge.

Osiris Temple is the highest prominence in a series of three connected landforms extending south to Granite Gorge, namely Osiris Temple, Horus Temple, and Tower of Set. The western flanks of the landforms drain into regions of Lower Ninetyfour Mile Creek & Canyon; the eastern flanks drainage is into Trinity Canyon. The headwaters of Trinity Canyon is the southern flank of Shiva Temple, the parent landform of Osiris Temple. The Shiva Temple is a heavily forested tableland-butte, one of two such remnants of the North Rim (Kaibab Plateau). The other tableland is Wotans Throne, adjacent Cape Royal viewpoint.

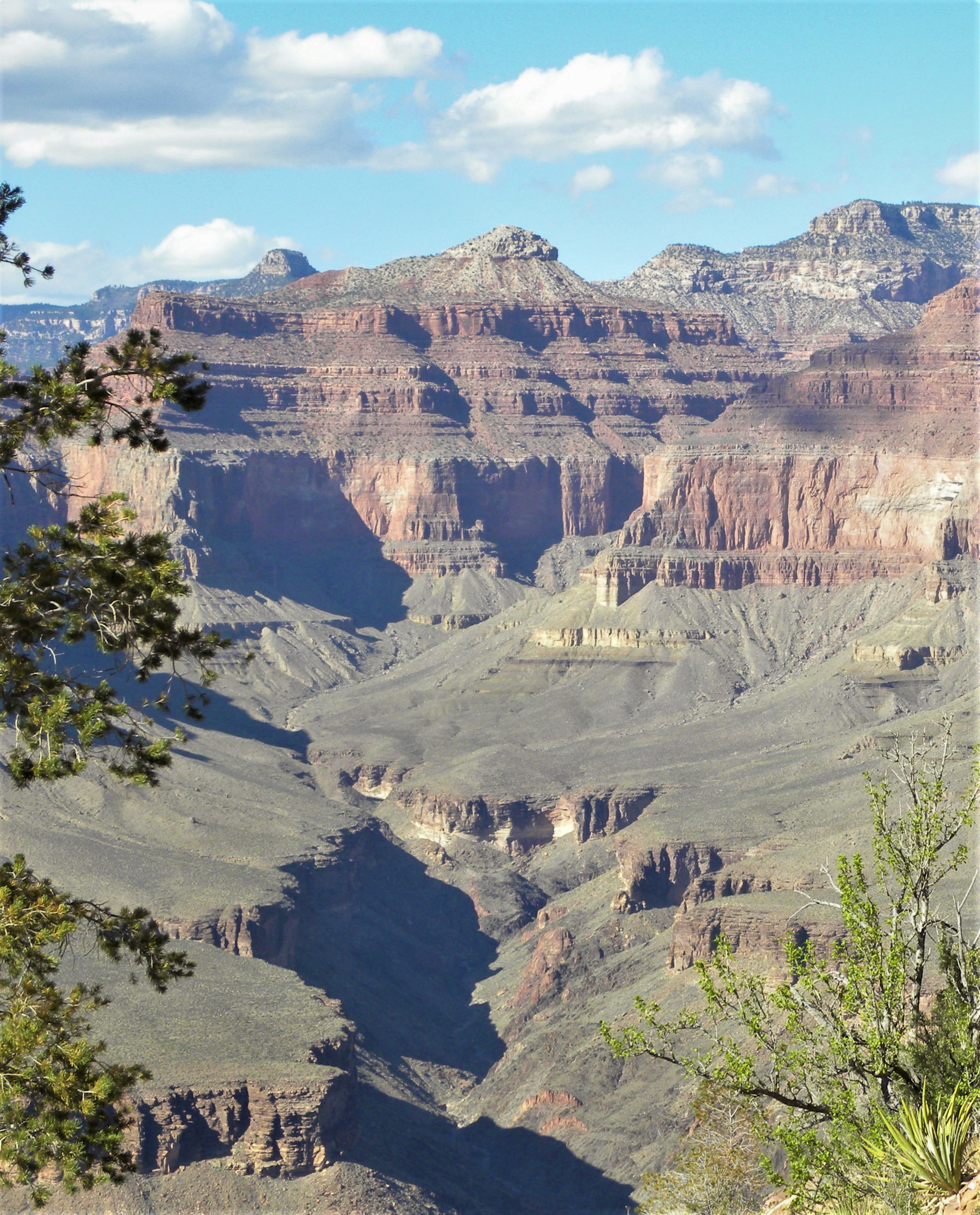
Looking north up Ninetyfour Mile Creek drainage to Osiris Temple, from Hermit Trail
