= Shiva Temple (Grand Canyon) =

Landform in the Grand Canyon, Arizona

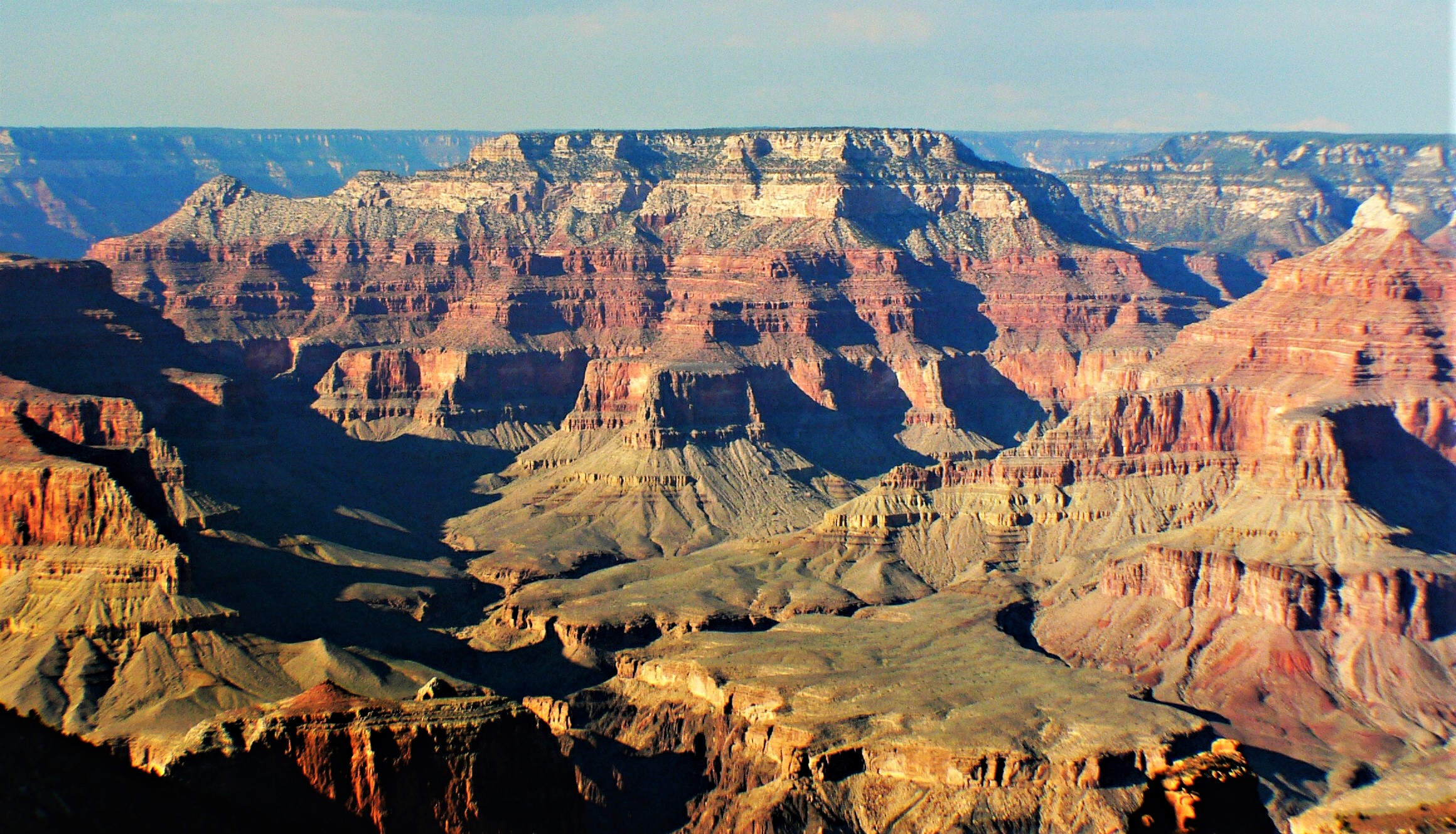
- South aspect, from South Rim

Highest point
- Elevation: 7,646 ft (2,331 m)
- Prominence: 1,351 ft (412 m)
- Parent peak: Dragon Head (7,765 ft)
- Isolation: 2.65 mi (4.26 km)
- Coordinates: 36°10′04″N 112°09′49″W

Geography
- Location within Arizona Location within the United States
- Country: United States
- State: Arizona
- County: Coconino
- Protected area: Grand Canyon National Park
- Parent range: Kaibab Plateau; Colorado Plateau
- Topo map: USGS Shiva Temple

Geology
- Rock type(s): Kaibab Limestone; Coconino Sandstone

Climbing
- First ascent: Puebloans
- Easiest route: class 4 climbing

Shiva Temple is a 7,646-foot-elevation (2,331-meter) summit located in the Grand Canyon, in Coconino County of Arizona, US. It is situated six miles north of Hopi Point overlook of the canyon's South Rim, about 2.5 miles southwest of North Rim's Tiyo Point, and two miles northwest of Isis Temple, where it towers 5,200 feet (1,600 meters) above the Colorado River. Shiva Temple is named for Shiva, the Hindu deity, destroyer of the universe. This name was applied by Clarence Dutton who began the tradition of naming geographical features in the Grand Canyon after mythological deities. Dutton believed Shiva Temple was the largest, grandest, and most majestic of the Grand Canyon buttes, with a broad, level, forested top. This mountain's name was officially adopted in 1906 by the U.S. Board on Geographic Names.

In 1937, the American Museum of Natural History led explorations to Shiva Temple and Wotans Throne in the belief that these buttes, isolated for 100,000 years from the plateau, may have evolved new species. The scientists discovered Ancestral Puebloan dwellings, deer antlers, and an empty Kodak film box that had been left behind a month earlier by pioneer Emery Kolb, his daughter Edith, Ruth Stephens Baker, Gordon Berger, and Ralph White, but no new species.

According to the Köppen climate classification system, Shiva Temple has a Cold semi-arid climate.

== Geology ==
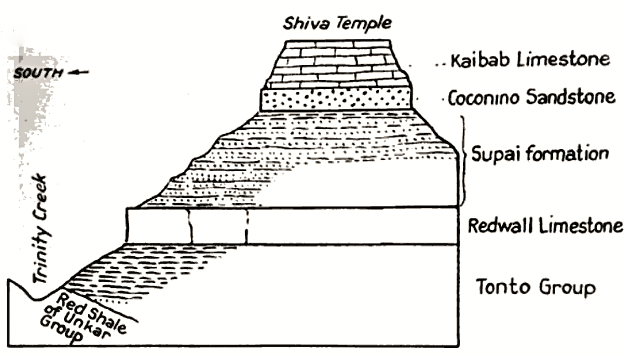
Shiva Temple strata

The top of Shiva Temple is composed of Permian Kaibab Limestone overlaying cream-colored, cliff-forming, Permian Coconino Sandstone. The conspicuous band of sandstone, which is the third-youngest strata in the Grand Canyon, was deposited 265 million years ago as sand dunes. Below the Coconino Sandstone is slope-forming, reddish terraces of the Pennsylvanian-Permian Supai Group. Further down are strata of Mississippian Redwall Limestone, and finally the Cambrian Tonto Group. Precipitation runoff from Shiva Temple drains south to the Colorado River via Trinity and Crystal Creeks.

== Prominence – A plateau/tableland ==
The tableland plateau of Shiva Temple's prominence is made up of a forest of Ponderosa Pine; also pines, junipers, shrubs, and cacti. The animals found in the survey expedition of 1937 were chipmunks, cottontail rabbits, pack rats, mice species, and rock squirrels.

== Gallery ==
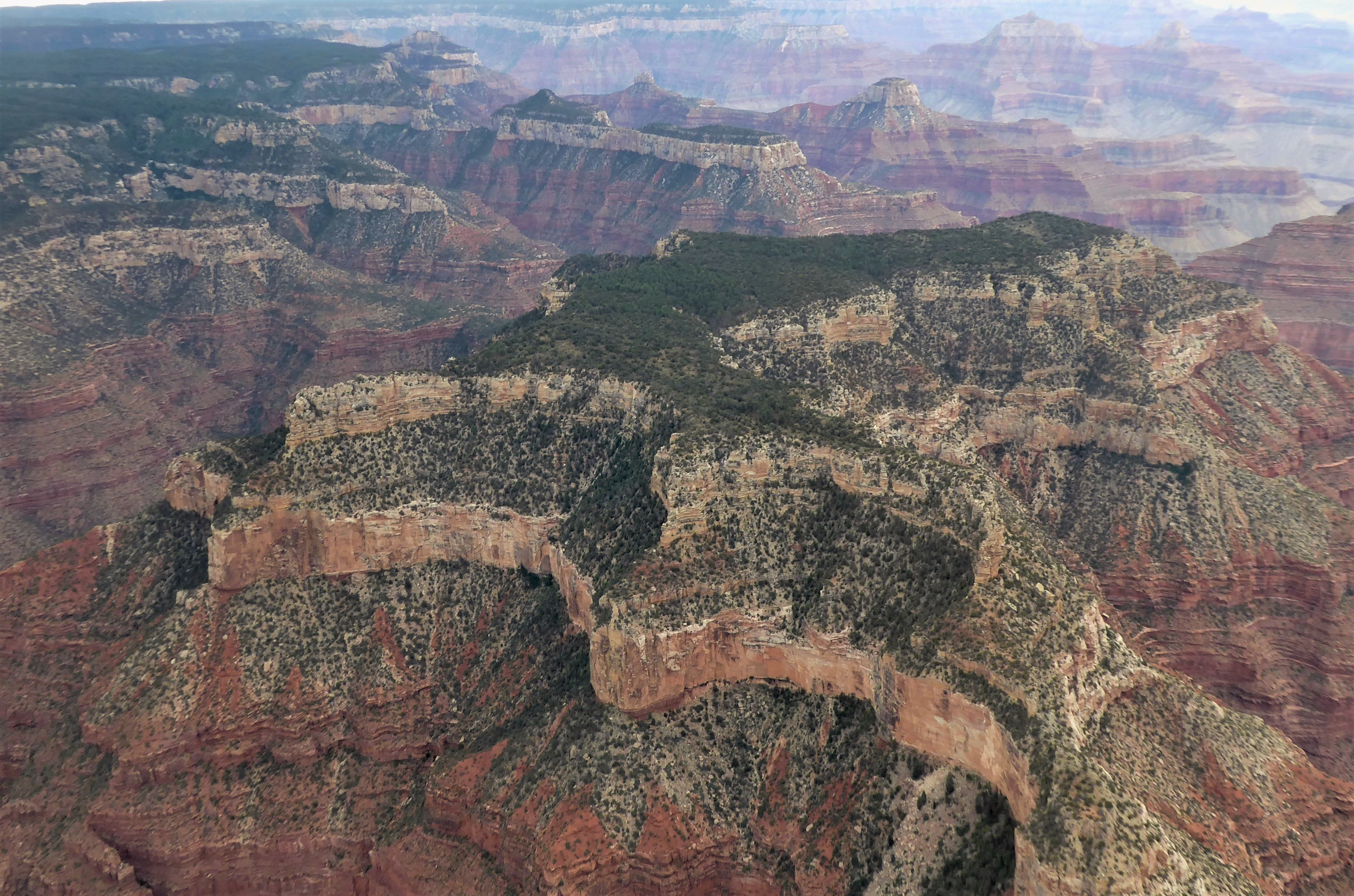
Aerial view from the west

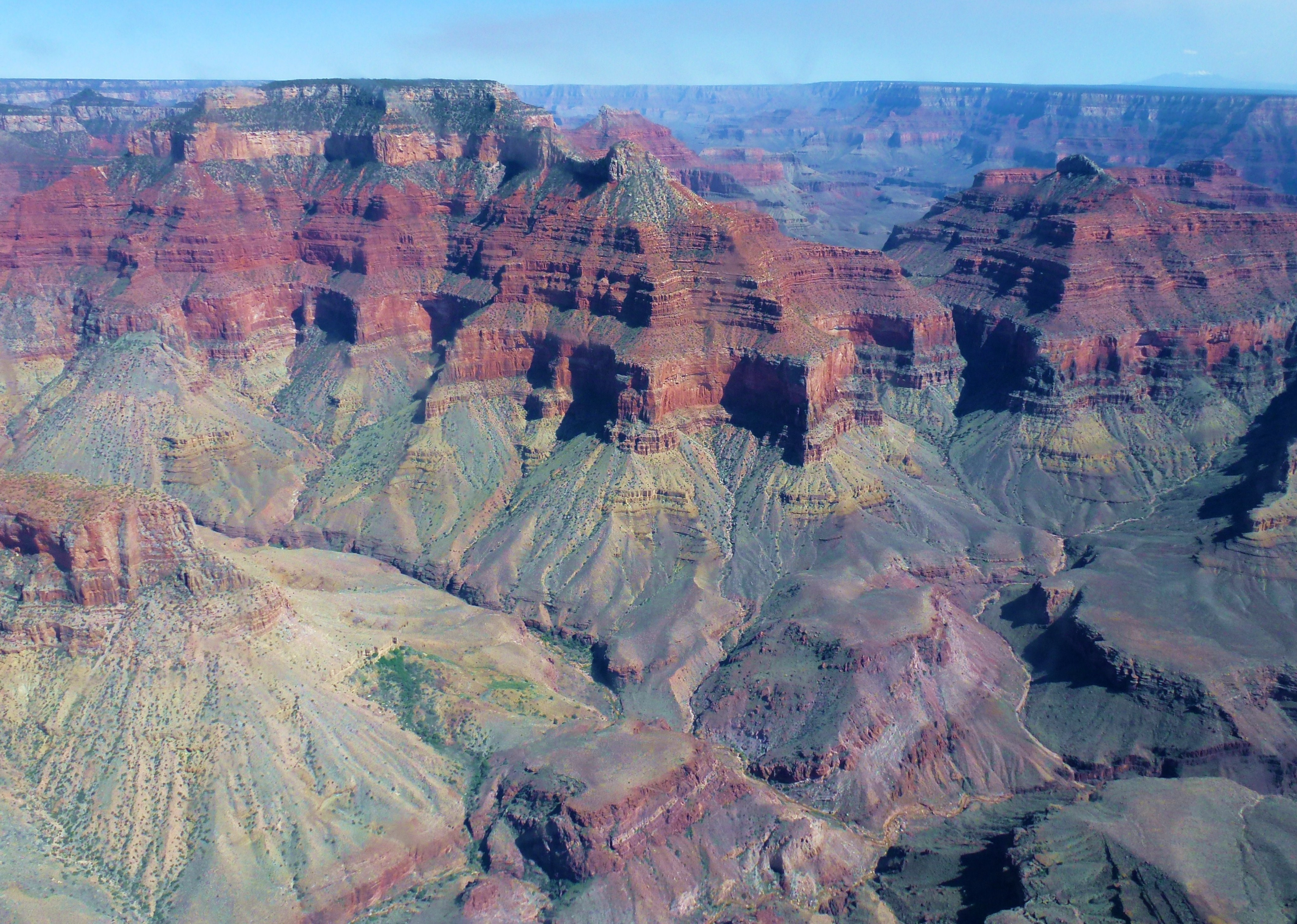
Shiva Temple (left), Osiris Temple (right)

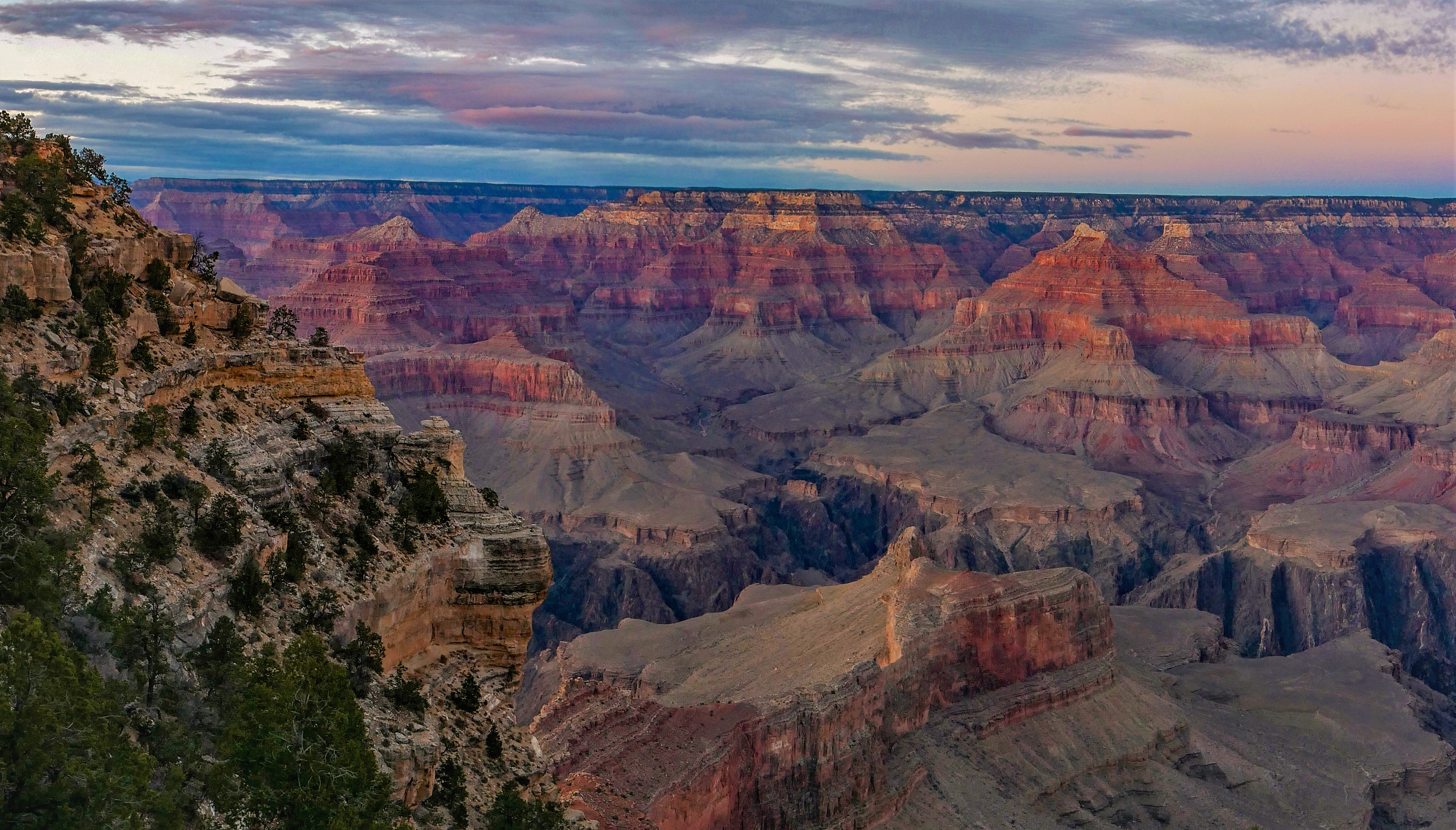
Shiva Temple centered in the distance, from Powell Point at sunset

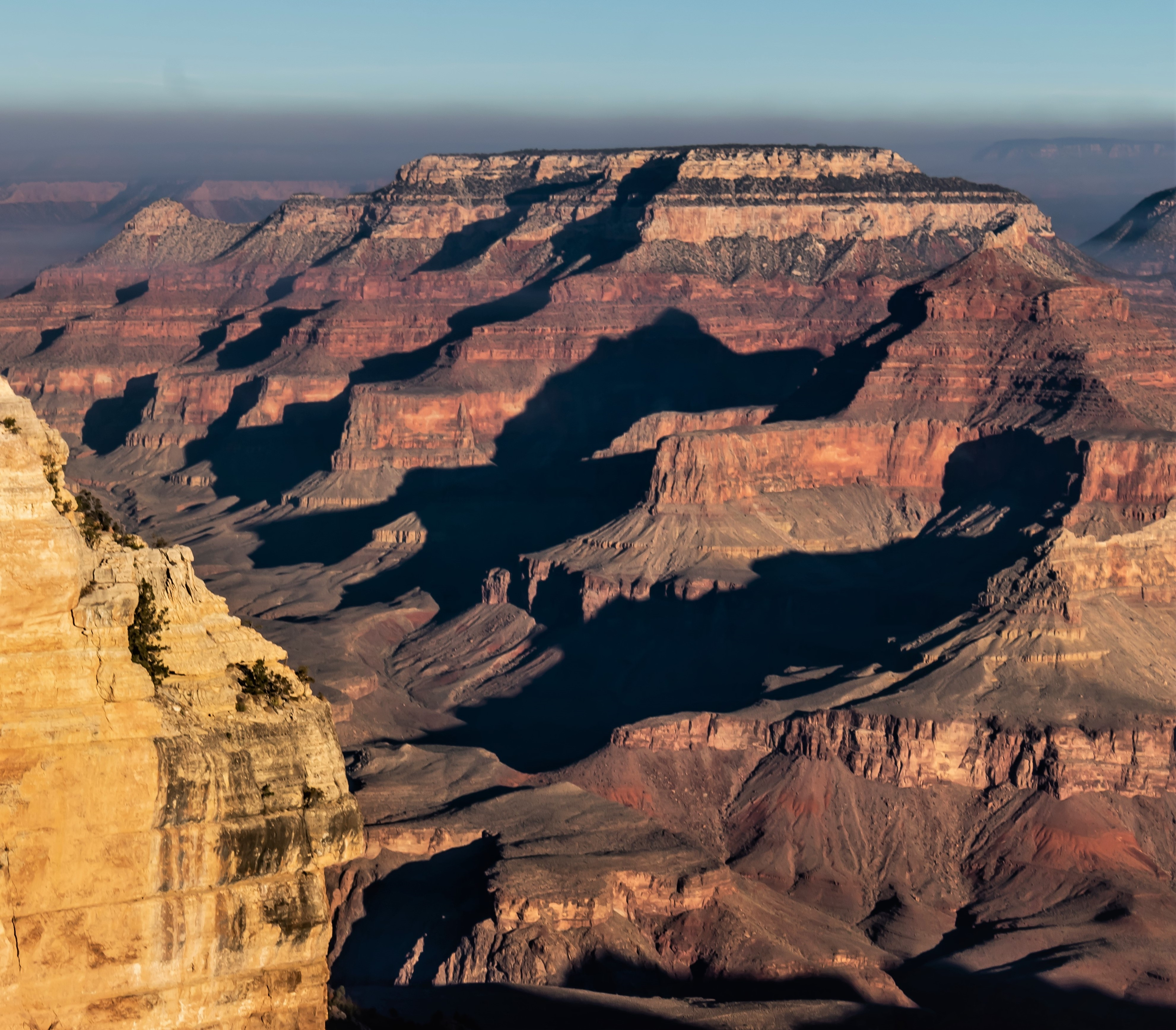
Geologic layers of Shiva Temple

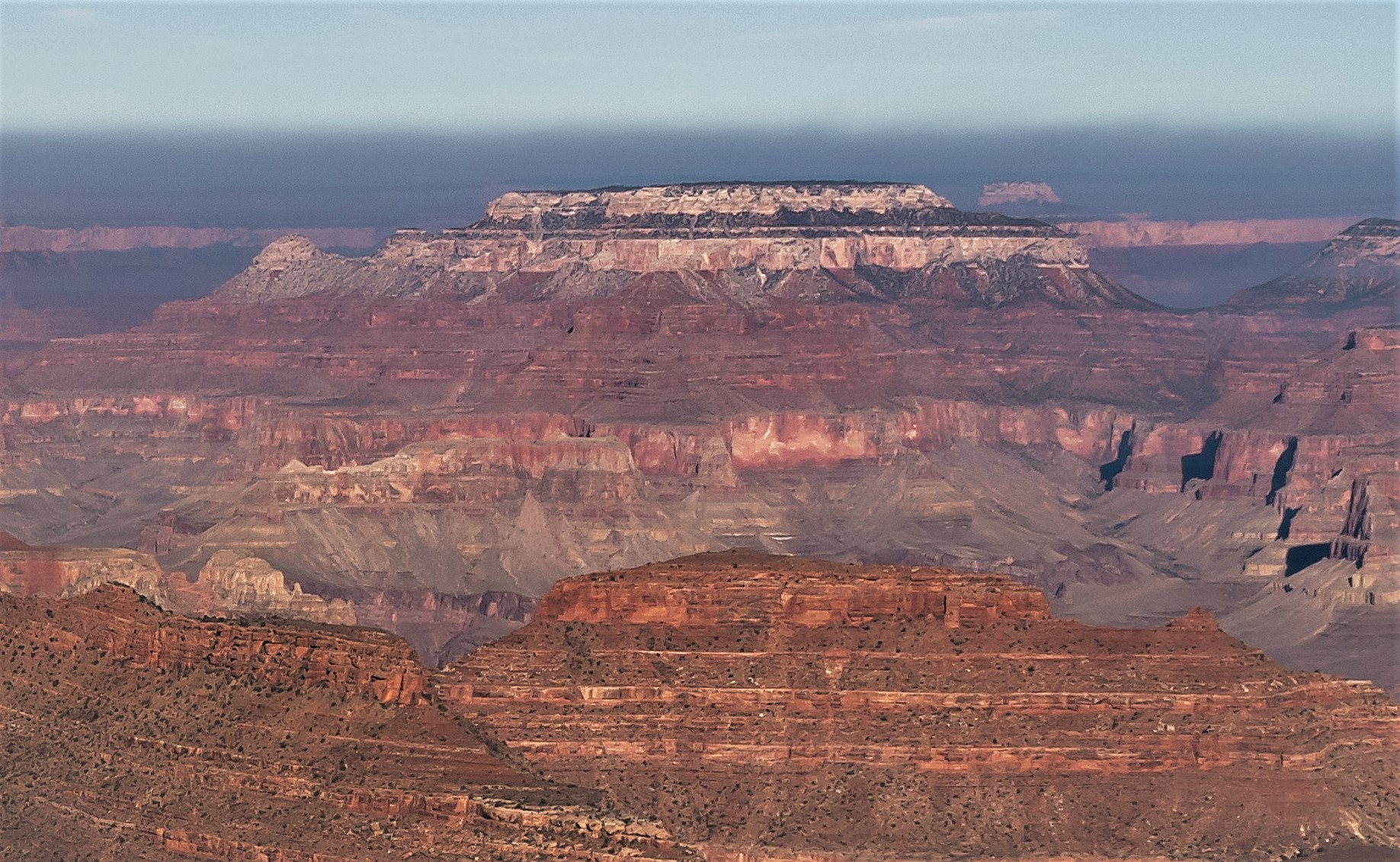
Shiva Temple from southeast at Grandview Point

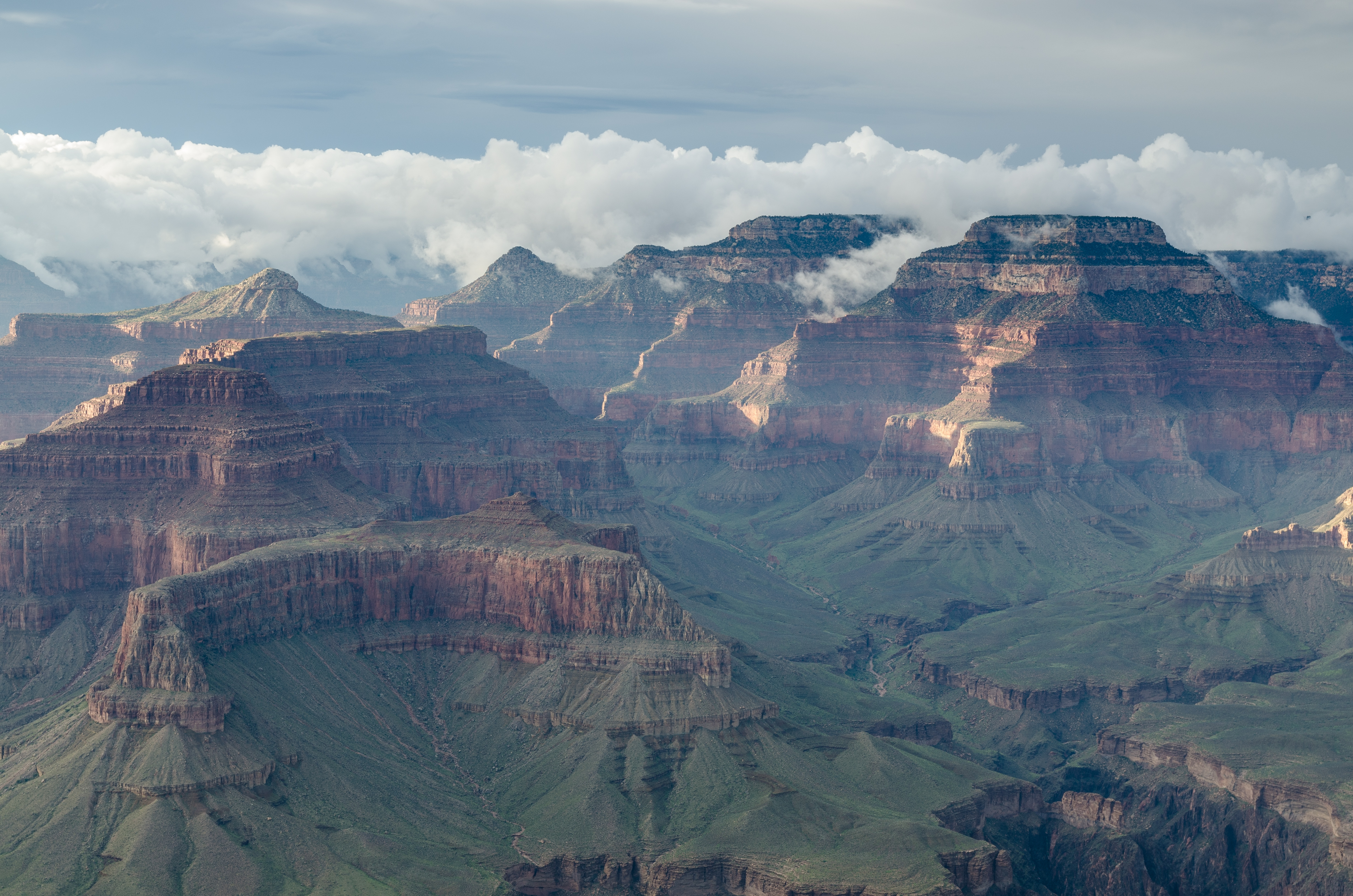
Shiva Temple to the right, from Hopi Point

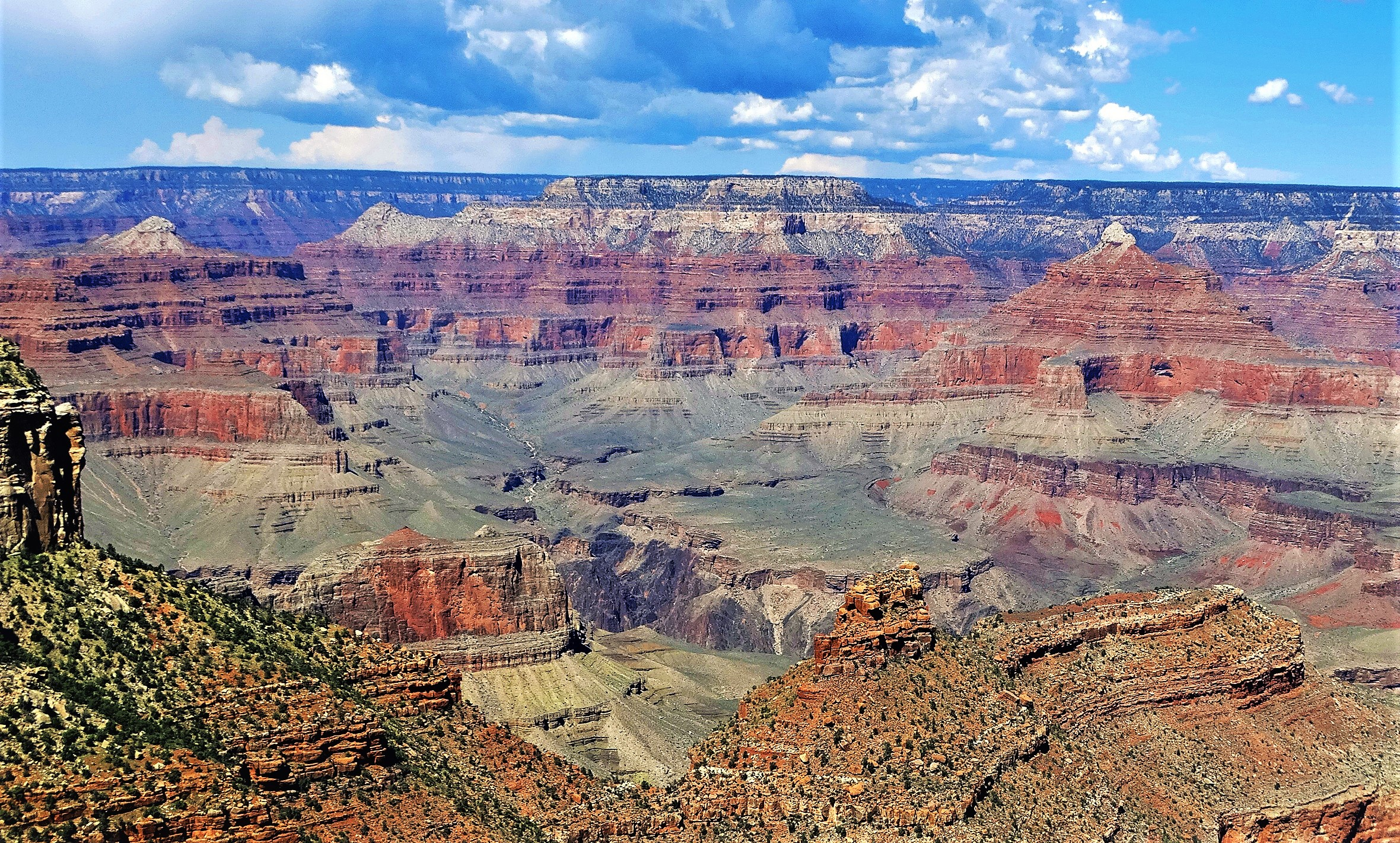
Shiva Temple centered

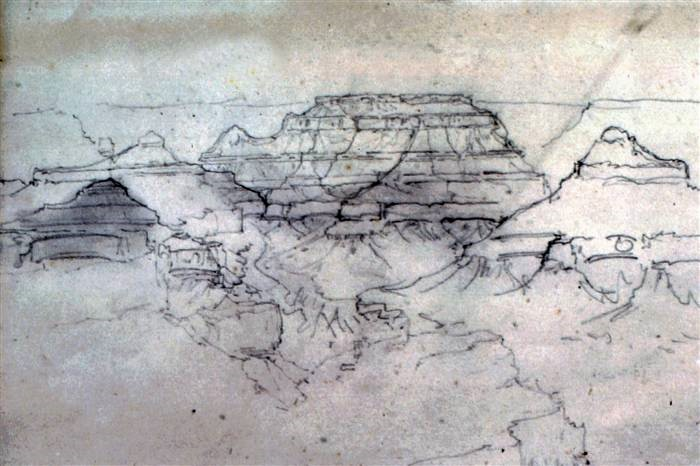
Shiva Temple, 1872 pencil on paper drawing by Thomas Moran

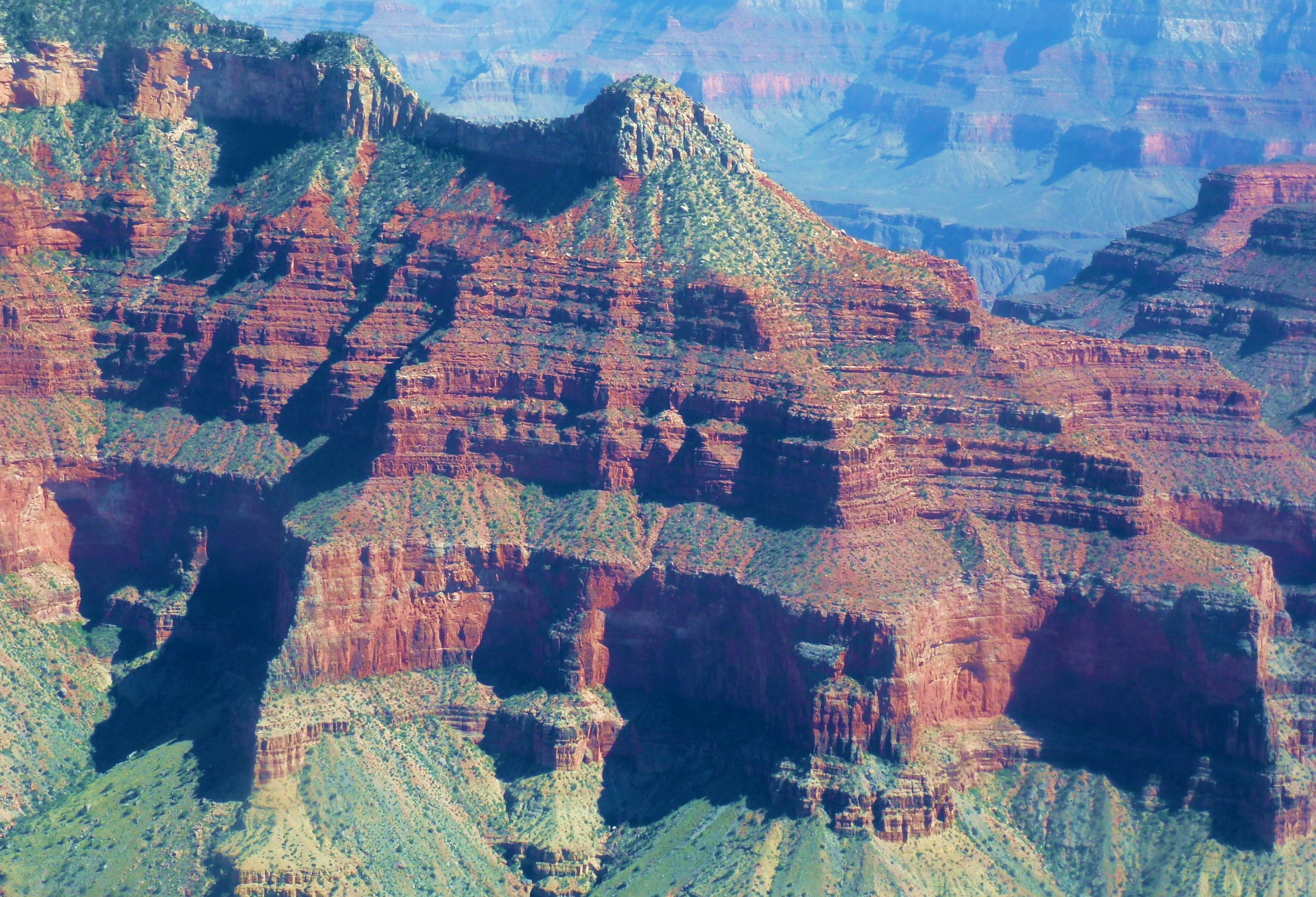
Claude Birdseye Point (west spur of Shiva Temple), named for Claude Hale Birdseye (1878–1941), Chief Topographic Engineer with the U.S. Geological Survey, whose expedition in 1923 down a portion of the Colorado River did much to advance knowledge about the Grand Canyon area.

== See also ==
- Geology of the Grand Canyon area
